

227001–227100 

|-bgcolor=#d6d6d6
| 227001 ||  || — || December 10, 2004 || Socorro || LINEAR || EOS || align=right | 3.5 km || 
|-id=002 bgcolor=#d6d6d6
| 227002 ||  || — || December 10, 2004 || Socorro || LINEAR || THM || align=right | 5.0 km || 
|-id=003 bgcolor=#d6d6d6
| 227003 ||  || — || December 10, 2004 || Campo Imperatore || CINEOS || — || align=right | 4.5 km || 
|-id=004 bgcolor=#d6d6d6
| 227004 ||  || — || December 11, 2004 || Kitt Peak || Spacewatch || — || align=right | 3.9 km || 
|-id=005 bgcolor=#d6d6d6
| 227005 ||  || — || December 14, 2004 || Socorro || LINEAR || — || align=right | 5.9 km || 
|-id=006 bgcolor=#d6d6d6
| 227006 ||  || — || December 10, 2004 || Socorro || LINEAR || — || align=right | 5.1 km || 
|-id=007 bgcolor=#d6d6d6
| 227007 ||  || — || December 10, 2004 || Anderson Mesa || LONEOS || — || align=right | 4.0 km || 
|-id=008 bgcolor=#d6d6d6
| 227008 ||  || — || December 12, 2004 || Kitt Peak || Spacewatch || — || align=right | 4.3 km || 
|-id=009 bgcolor=#d6d6d6
| 227009 ||  || — || December 14, 2004 || Socorro || LINEAR || URS || align=right | 6.1 km || 
|-id=010 bgcolor=#d6d6d6
| 227010 ||  || — || December 10, 2004 || Socorro || LINEAR || — || align=right | 4.8 km || 
|-id=011 bgcolor=#d6d6d6
| 227011 ||  || — || December 11, 2004 || Catalina || CSS || — || align=right | 2.3 km || 
|-id=012 bgcolor=#d6d6d6
| 227012 ||  || — || December 14, 2004 || Catalina || CSS || — || align=right | 5.3 km || 
|-id=013 bgcolor=#E9E9E9
| 227013 ||  || — || December 13, 2004 || Catalina || CSS || — || align=right | 4.1 km || 
|-id=014 bgcolor=#d6d6d6
| 227014 ||  || — || December 15, 2004 || Socorro || LINEAR || — || align=right | 4.7 km || 
|-id=015 bgcolor=#d6d6d6
| 227015 ||  || — || December 15, 2004 || Socorro || LINEAR || — || align=right | 4.9 km || 
|-id=016 bgcolor=#d6d6d6
| 227016 ||  || — || December 15, 2004 || Socorro || LINEAR || — || align=right | 3.7 km || 
|-id=017 bgcolor=#d6d6d6
| 227017 ||  || — || December 15, 2004 || Socorro || LINEAR || — || align=right | 4.2 km || 
|-id=018 bgcolor=#d6d6d6
| 227018 ||  || — || December 9, 2004 || Kitt Peak || Spacewatch || HYG || align=right | 4.2 km || 
|-id=019 bgcolor=#d6d6d6
| 227019 ||  || — || December 15, 2004 || Kitt Peak || Spacewatch || THM || align=right | 3.0 km || 
|-id=020 bgcolor=#d6d6d6
| 227020 ||  || — || December 12, 2004 || Kitt Peak || Spacewatch || — || align=right | 2.4 km || 
|-id=021 bgcolor=#d6d6d6
| 227021 ||  || — || December 3, 2004 || Kitt Peak || Spacewatch || HYG || align=right | 4.9 km || 
|-id=022 bgcolor=#d6d6d6
| 227022 ||  || — || December 11, 2004 || Kitt Peak || Spacewatch || — || align=right | 4.0 km || 
|-id=023 bgcolor=#d6d6d6
| 227023 ||  || — || December 14, 2004 || Socorro || LINEAR || — || align=right | 4.8 km || 
|-id=024 bgcolor=#d6d6d6
| 227024 ||  || — || December 16, 2004 || Catalina || CSS || — || align=right | 5.4 km || 
|-id=025 bgcolor=#d6d6d6
| 227025 ||  || — || December 16, 2004 || Kitt Peak || Spacewatch || — || align=right | 3.1 km || 
|-id=026 bgcolor=#d6d6d6
| 227026 ||  || — || December 19, 2004 || Mount Lemmon || Mount Lemmon Survey || — || align=right | 4.2 km || 
|-id=027 bgcolor=#d6d6d6
| 227027 ||  || — || December 18, 2004 || Socorro || LINEAR || — || align=right | 7.7 km || 
|-id=028 bgcolor=#fefefe
| 227028 ||  || — || January 7, 2005 || Socorro || LINEAR || H || align=right data-sort-value="0.87" | 870 m || 
|-id=029 bgcolor=#d6d6d6
| 227029 ||  || — || January 6, 2005 || Catalina || CSS || — || align=right | 4.0 km || 
|-id=030 bgcolor=#d6d6d6
| 227030 ||  || — || January 6, 2005 || Socorro || LINEAR || — || align=right | 4.3 km || 
|-id=031 bgcolor=#d6d6d6
| 227031 ||  || — || January 7, 2005 || Socorro || LINEAR || — || align=right | 3.3 km || 
|-id=032 bgcolor=#d6d6d6
| 227032 ||  || — || January 11, 2005 || Socorro || LINEAR || — || align=right | 3.4 km || 
|-id=033 bgcolor=#d6d6d6
| 227033 ||  || — || January 11, 2005 || WISE || Wise Obs. || HYG || align=right | 3.9 km || 
|-id=034 bgcolor=#fefefe
| 227034 ||  || — || January 13, 2005 || Socorro || LINEAR || H || align=right | 1.1 km || 
|-id=035 bgcolor=#d6d6d6
| 227035 ||  || — || January 13, 2005 || Socorro || LINEAR || — || align=right | 4.8 km || 
|-id=036 bgcolor=#fefefe
| 227036 ||  || — || January 13, 2005 || Kitt Peak || Spacewatch || H || align=right data-sort-value="0.77" | 770 m || 
|-id=037 bgcolor=#d6d6d6
| 227037 ||  || — || January 13, 2005 || Kitt Peak || Spacewatch || HYG || align=right | 5.1 km || 
|-id=038 bgcolor=#d6d6d6
| 227038 ||  || — || January 15, 2005 || Catalina || CSS || — || align=right | 6.9 km || 
|-id=039 bgcolor=#d6d6d6
| 227039 ||  || — || January 15, 2005 || Kitt Peak || Spacewatch || THM || align=right | 4.0 km || 
|-id=040 bgcolor=#d6d6d6
| 227040 ||  || — || January 15, 2005 || Socorro || LINEAR || — || align=right | 3.7 km || 
|-id=041 bgcolor=#d6d6d6
| 227041 ||  || — || January 13, 2005 || Kitt Peak || Spacewatch || — || align=right | 3.8 km || 
|-id=042 bgcolor=#fefefe
| 227042 ||  || — || January 16, 2005 || Socorro || LINEAR || H || align=right data-sort-value="0.69" | 690 m || 
|-id=043 bgcolor=#d6d6d6
| 227043 ||  || — || January 16, 2005 || Socorro || LINEAR || — || align=right | 6.0 km || 
|-id=044 bgcolor=#d6d6d6
| 227044 ||  || — || January 17, 2005 || Kitt Peak || Spacewatch || — || align=right | 6.3 km || 
|-id=045 bgcolor=#fefefe
| 227045 ||  || — || January 20, 2005 || Anderson Mesa || LONEOS || H || align=right data-sort-value="0.72" | 720 m || 
|-id=046 bgcolor=#d6d6d6
| 227046 ||  || — || January 31, 2005 || Palomar || NEAT || — || align=right | 4.8 km || 
|-id=047 bgcolor=#d6d6d6
| 227047 || 2005 CH || — || February 1, 2005 || Catalina || CSS || HYG || align=right | 4.1 km || 
|-id=048 bgcolor=#d6d6d6
| 227048 ||  || — || February 1, 2005 || Kitt Peak || Spacewatch || — || align=right | 3.2 km || 
|-id=049 bgcolor=#d6d6d6
| 227049 ||  || — || February 4, 2005 || Socorro || LINEAR || EUP || align=right | 5.6 km || 
|-id=050 bgcolor=#d6d6d6
| 227050 ||  || — || February 3, 2005 || Socorro || LINEAR || — || align=right | 3.9 km || 
|-id=051 bgcolor=#d6d6d6
| 227051 ||  || — || February 5, 2005 || Uccle || T. Pauwels || — || align=right | 5.3 km || 
|-id=052 bgcolor=#fefefe
| 227052 ||  || — || February 2, 2005 || Kitt Peak || Spacewatch || — || align=right | 1.2 km || 
|-id=053 bgcolor=#d6d6d6
| 227053 ||  || — || February 4, 2005 || Palomar || NEAT || — || align=right | 5.2 km || 
|-id=054 bgcolor=#fefefe
| 227054 ||  || — || March 1, 2005 || Catalina || CSS || H || align=right data-sort-value="0.79" | 790 m || 
|-id=055 bgcolor=#d6d6d6
| 227055 ||  || — || March 7, 2005 || Goodricke-Pigott || R. A. Tucker || THB || align=right | 4.7 km || 
|-id=056 bgcolor=#d6d6d6
| 227056 ||  || — || March 3, 2005 || Catalina || CSS || THM || align=right | 2.9 km || 
|-id=057 bgcolor=#d6d6d6
| 227057 ||  || — || March 8, 2005 || Socorro || LINEAR || — || align=right | 6.1 km || 
|-id=058 bgcolor=#d6d6d6
| 227058 ||  || — || March 7, 2005 || Socorro || LINEAR || HYG || align=right | 5.4 km || 
|-id=059 bgcolor=#fefefe
| 227059 ||  || — || March 9, 2005 || Catalina || CSS || H || align=right | 1.2 km || 
|-id=060 bgcolor=#d6d6d6
| 227060 ||  || — || March 8, 2005 || Catalina || CSS || EUP || align=right | 4.9 km || 
|-id=061 bgcolor=#d6d6d6
| 227061 ||  || — || March 4, 2005 || Catalina || CSS || EUP || align=right | 6.3 km || 
|-id=062 bgcolor=#d6d6d6
| 227062 ||  || — || March 13, 2005 || Kitt Peak || Spacewatch || 3:2 || align=right | 6.5 km || 
|-id=063 bgcolor=#d6d6d6
| 227063 ||  || — || March 10, 2005 || Catalina || CSS || HYG || align=right | 4.7 km || 
|-id=064 bgcolor=#d6d6d6
| 227064 ||  || — || March 30, 2005 || Catalina || CSS || — || align=right | 3.1 km || 
|-id=065 bgcolor=#d6d6d6
| 227065 Romandia ||  ||  || April 1, 2005 || Vicques || M. Ory || 3:2 || align=right | 9.5 km || 
|-id=066 bgcolor=#fefefe
| 227066 ||  || — || April 2, 2005 || Mount Lemmon || Mount Lemmon Survey || — || align=right | 1.6 km || 
|-id=067 bgcolor=#fefefe
| 227067 ||  || — || April 4, 2005 || Mount Lemmon || Mount Lemmon Survey || — || align=right data-sort-value="0.87" | 870 m || 
|-id=068 bgcolor=#fefefe
| 227068 ||  || — || April 6, 2005 || Mount Lemmon || Mount Lemmon Survey || — || align=right data-sort-value="0.86" | 860 m || 
|-id=069 bgcolor=#fefefe
| 227069 ||  || — || April 12, 2005 || Anderson Mesa || LONEOS || H || align=right data-sort-value="0.78" | 780 m || 
|-id=070 bgcolor=#fefefe
| 227070 ||  || — || April 16, 2005 || Kitt Peak || Spacewatch || — || align=right | 1.0 km || 
|-id=071 bgcolor=#fefefe
| 227071 ||  || — || May 8, 2005 || Kitt Peak || Spacewatch || NYS || align=right data-sort-value="0.81" | 810 m || 
|-id=072 bgcolor=#fefefe
| 227072 ||  || — || May 3, 2005 || Kitt Peak || Spacewatch || — || align=right | 1.0 km || 
|-id=073 bgcolor=#fefefe
| 227073 ||  || — || May 8, 2005 || Kitt Peak || Spacewatch || — || align=right data-sort-value="0.94" | 940 m || 
|-id=074 bgcolor=#d6d6d6
| 227074 ||  || — || May 11, 2005 || Kitt Peak || Spacewatch || SHU3:2 || align=right | 8.3 km || 
|-id=075 bgcolor=#fefefe
| 227075 ||  || — || May 10, 2005 || Catalina || CSS || — || align=right data-sort-value="0.90" | 900 m || 
|-id=076 bgcolor=#fefefe
| 227076 ||  || — || May 15, 2005 || Mount Lemmon || Mount Lemmon Survey || — || align=right data-sort-value="0.77" | 770 m || 
|-id=077 bgcolor=#C2FFFF
| 227077 ||  || — || June 8, 2005 || Kitt Peak || Spacewatch || L4 || align=right | 9.8 km || 
|-id=078 bgcolor=#C2FFFF
| 227078 ||  || — || June 8, 2005 || Kitt Peak || Spacewatch || L4 || align=right | 11 km || 
|-id=079 bgcolor=#fefefe
| 227079 ||  || — || June 4, 2005 || Kitt Peak || Spacewatch || — || align=right data-sort-value="0.73" | 730 m || 
|-id=080 bgcolor=#fefefe
| 227080 ||  || — || June 12, 2005 || Kitt Peak || Spacewatch || — || align=right data-sort-value="0.86" | 860 m || 
|-id=081 bgcolor=#fefefe
| 227081 ||  || — || June 9, 2005 || Kitt Peak || Spacewatch || V || align=right data-sort-value="0.85" | 850 m || 
|-id=082 bgcolor=#C2FFFF
| 227082 ||  || — || June 11, 2005 || Kitt Peak || Spacewatch || L4 || align=right | 11 km || 
|-id=083 bgcolor=#fefefe
| 227083 ||  || — || June 14, 2005 || Mount Lemmon || Mount Lemmon Survey || — || align=right data-sort-value="0.76" | 760 m || 
|-id=084 bgcolor=#fefefe
| 227084 ||  || — || June 13, 2005 || Mount Lemmon || Mount Lemmon Survey || MAS || align=right data-sort-value="0.86" | 860 m || 
|-id=085 bgcolor=#fefefe
| 227085 || 2005 MZ || — || June 17, 2005 || Mount Lemmon || Mount Lemmon Survey || MAS || align=right data-sort-value="0.78" | 780 m || 
|-id=086 bgcolor=#fefefe
| 227086 ||  || — || June 18, 2005 || Mount Lemmon || Mount Lemmon Survey || — || align=right data-sort-value="0.93" | 930 m || 
|-id=087 bgcolor=#fefefe
| 227087 ||  || — || June 27, 2005 || Kitt Peak || Spacewatch || — || align=right | 1.1 km || 
|-id=088 bgcolor=#fefefe
| 227088 ||  || — || June 28, 2005 || Kitt Peak || Spacewatch || — || align=right data-sort-value="0.80" | 800 m || 
|-id=089 bgcolor=#fefefe
| 227089 ||  || — || June 27, 2005 || Kitt Peak || Spacewatch || FLO || align=right data-sort-value="0.64" | 640 m || 
|-id=090 bgcolor=#fefefe
| 227090 ||  || — || June 27, 2005 || Kitt Peak || Spacewatch || NYS || align=right data-sort-value="0.83" | 830 m || 
|-id=091 bgcolor=#fefefe
| 227091 ||  || — || June 30, 2005 || Palomar || NEAT || — || align=right data-sort-value="0.87" | 870 m || 
|-id=092 bgcolor=#fefefe
| 227092 ||  || — || June 30, 2005 || Kitt Peak || Spacewatch || NYS || align=right data-sort-value="0.97" | 970 m || 
|-id=093 bgcolor=#fefefe
| 227093 ||  || — || June 27, 2005 || Campo Imperatore || CINEOS || NYS || align=right data-sort-value="0.76" | 760 m || 
|-id=094 bgcolor=#fefefe
| 227094 ||  || — || June 29, 2005 || Kitt Peak || Spacewatch || FLO || align=right data-sort-value="0.92" | 920 m || 
|-id=095 bgcolor=#fefefe
| 227095 ||  || — || June 30, 2005 || Kitt Peak || Spacewatch || — || align=right data-sort-value="0.77" | 770 m || 
|-id=096 bgcolor=#fefefe
| 227096 ||  || — || June 30, 2005 || Kitt Peak || Spacewatch || — || align=right data-sort-value="0.80" | 800 m || 
|-id=097 bgcolor=#fefefe
| 227097 ||  || — || June 30, 2005 || Kitt Peak || Spacewatch || NYS || align=right data-sort-value="0.78" | 780 m || 
|-id=098 bgcolor=#fefefe
| 227098 ||  || — || June 29, 2005 || Palomar || NEAT || NYS || align=right data-sort-value="0.84" | 840 m || 
|-id=099 bgcolor=#fefefe
| 227099 ||  || — || June 30, 2005 || Kitt Peak || Spacewatch || MAS || align=right data-sort-value="0.75" | 750 m || 
|-id=100 bgcolor=#fefefe
| 227100 ||  || — || June 30, 2005 || Kitt Peak || Spacewatch || — || align=right | 1.0 km || 
|}

227101–227200 

|-bgcolor=#fefefe
| 227101 ||  || — || July 5, 2005 || Kitt Peak || Spacewatch || NYS || align=right data-sort-value="0.71" | 710 m || 
|-id=102 bgcolor=#fefefe
| 227102 ||  || — || July 4, 2005 || Socorro || LINEAR || — || align=right | 1.2 km || 
|-id=103 bgcolor=#fefefe
| 227103 ||  || — || July 4, 2005 || Kitt Peak || Spacewatch || — || align=right | 1.3 km || 
|-id=104 bgcolor=#fefefe
| 227104 ||  || — || July 5, 2005 || Mount Lemmon || Mount Lemmon Survey || — || align=right | 1.1 km || 
|-id=105 bgcolor=#fefefe
| 227105 ||  || — || July 5, 2005 || Palomar || NEAT || — || align=right | 2.3 km || 
|-id=106 bgcolor=#fefefe
| 227106 ||  || — || July 5, 2005 || Kitt Peak || Spacewatch || — || align=right | 1.2 km || 
|-id=107 bgcolor=#fefefe
| 227107 ||  || — || July 5, 2005 || Mount Lemmon || Mount Lemmon Survey || — || align=right data-sort-value="0.81" | 810 m || 
|-id=108 bgcolor=#fefefe
| 227108 ||  || — || July 5, 2005 || Palomar || NEAT || — || align=right data-sort-value="0.95" | 950 m || 
|-id=109 bgcolor=#fefefe
| 227109 ||  || — || July 5, 2005 || Palomar || NEAT || FLO || align=right data-sort-value="0.70" | 700 m || 
|-id=110 bgcolor=#fefefe
| 227110 ||  || — || July 9, 2005 || Kitt Peak || Spacewatch || NYS || align=right | 1.9 km || 
|-id=111 bgcolor=#fefefe
| 227111 ||  || — || July 10, 2005 || Catalina || CSS || — || align=right | 1.1 km || 
|-id=112 bgcolor=#fefefe
| 227112 ||  || — || July 10, 2005 || Kitt Peak || Spacewatch || FLO || align=right data-sort-value="0.66" | 660 m || 
|-id=113 bgcolor=#fefefe
| 227113 ||  || — || July 7, 2005 || Reedy Creek || J. Broughton || — || align=right | 1.9 km || 
|-id=114 bgcolor=#fefefe
| 227114 ||  || — || July 5, 2005 || Mount Lemmon || Mount Lemmon Survey || — || align=right data-sort-value="0.93" | 930 m || 
|-id=115 bgcolor=#fefefe
| 227115 ||  || — || July 11, 2005 || Kitt Peak || Spacewatch || NYS || align=right data-sort-value="0.70" | 700 m || 
|-id=116 bgcolor=#fefefe
| 227116 ||  || — || July 1, 2005 || Kitt Peak || Spacewatch || FLO || align=right | 2.1 km || 
|-id=117 bgcolor=#fefefe
| 227117 ||  || — || July 1, 2005 || Kitt Peak || Spacewatch || NYS || align=right data-sort-value="0.88" | 880 m || 
|-id=118 bgcolor=#fefefe
| 227118 ||  || — || July 10, 2005 || Kitt Peak || Spacewatch || — || align=right | 1.1 km || 
|-id=119 bgcolor=#fefefe
| 227119 ||  || — || July 3, 2005 || Apache Point || Apache Point Obs. || — || align=right | 1.5 km || 
|-id=120 bgcolor=#fefefe
| 227120 ||  || — || July 3, 2005 || Catalina || CSS || — || align=right | 1.9 km || 
|-id=121 bgcolor=#fefefe
| 227121 ||  || — || July 4, 2005 || Palomar || NEAT || V || align=right data-sort-value="0.95" | 950 m || 
|-id=122 bgcolor=#fefefe
| 227122 ||  || — || July 4, 2005 || Palomar || NEAT || — || align=right | 1.4 km || 
|-id=123 bgcolor=#fefefe
| 227123 ||  || — || July 12, 2005 || Kitt Peak || Spacewatch || CLA || align=right | 1.9 km || 
|-id=124 bgcolor=#FA8072
| 227124 ||  || — || July 26, 2005 || Reedy Creek || J. Broughton || — || align=right | 1.2 km || 
|-id=125 bgcolor=#fefefe
| 227125 ||  || — || July 26, 2005 || Reedy Creek || J. Broughton || — || align=right | 1.2 km || 
|-id=126 bgcolor=#FA8072
| 227126 ||  || — || July 27, 2005 || Palomar || NEAT || — || align=right | 1.3 km || 
|-id=127 bgcolor=#E9E9E9
| 227127 ||  || — || July 28, 2005 || Palomar || NEAT || — || align=right | 1.7 km || 
|-id=128 bgcolor=#fefefe
| 227128 ||  || — || July 28, 2005 || Palomar || NEAT || NYS || align=right data-sort-value="0.97" | 970 m || 
|-id=129 bgcolor=#fefefe
| 227129 ||  || — || July 26, 2005 || Palomar || NEAT || ERI || align=right | 2.6 km || 
|-id=130 bgcolor=#fefefe
| 227130 ||  || — || July 27, 2005 || Palomar || NEAT || — || align=right | 1.1 km || 
|-id=131 bgcolor=#fefefe
| 227131 ||  || — || July 27, 2005 || Palomar || NEAT || MAS || align=right data-sort-value="0.85" | 850 m || 
|-id=132 bgcolor=#fefefe
| 227132 ||  || — || July 27, 2005 || Palomar || NEAT || — || align=right | 1.2 km || 
|-id=133 bgcolor=#fefefe
| 227133 ||  || — || July 29, 2005 || Palomar || NEAT || — || align=right | 2.1 km || 
|-id=134 bgcolor=#fefefe
| 227134 ||  || — || July 29, 2005 || Palomar || NEAT || FLO || align=right | 1.1 km || 
|-id=135 bgcolor=#fefefe
| 227135 ||  || — || July 29, 2005 || Palomar || NEAT || — || align=right | 1.2 km || 
|-id=136 bgcolor=#fefefe
| 227136 ||  || — || July 31, 2005 || Siding Spring || SSS || NYS || align=right data-sort-value="0.87" | 870 m || 
|-id=137 bgcolor=#fefefe
| 227137 ||  || — || July 29, 2005 || Reedy Creek || J. Broughton || NYS || align=right | 1.0 km || 
|-id=138 bgcolor=#fefefe
| 227138 ||  || — || July 30, 2005 || Reedy Creek || J. Broughton || — || align=right | 1.2 km || 
|-id=139 bgcolor=#fefefe
| 227139 ||  || — || July 29, 2005 || Palomar || NEAT || — || align=right | 1.0 km || 
|-id=140 bgcolor=#fefefe
| 227140 ||  || — || July 28, 2005 || Palomar || NEAT || — || align=right | 2.0 km || 
|-id=141 bgcolor=#fefefe
| 227141 || 2005 PJ || — || August 1, 2005 || Eskridge || Farpoint Obs. || MAS || align=right data-sort-value="0.88" | 880 m || 
|-id=142 bgcolor=#fefefe
| 227142 ||  || — || August 1, 2005 || Siding Spring || SSS || NYS || align=right data-sort-value="0.88" | 880 m || 
|-id=143 bgcolor=#fefefe
| 227143 ||  || — || August 1, 2005 || Siding Spring || SSS || — || align=right | 1.3 km || 
|-id=144 bgcolor=#fefefe
| 227144 ||  || — || August 4, 2005 || Črni Vrh || Črni Vrh || FLO || align=right data-sort-value="0.96" | 960 m || 
|-id=145 bgcolor=#fefefe
| 227145 ||  || — || August 2, 2005 || Socorro || LINEAR || — || align=right | 1.0 km || 
|-id=146 bgcolor=#fefefe
| 227146 ||  || — || August 2, 2005 || Socorro || LINEAR || NYS || align=right data-sort-value="0.81" | 810 m || 
|-id=147 bgcolor=#fefefe
| 227147 ||  || — || August 10, 2005 || Vicques || M. Ory || — || align=right data-sort-value="0.93" | 930 m || 
|-id=148 bgcolor=#fefefe
| 227148 ||  || — || August 4, 2005 || Palomar || NEAT || NYS || align=right data-sort-value="0.84" | 840 m || 
|-id=149 bgcolor=#fefefe
| 227149 ||  || — || August 4, 2005 || Palomar || NEAT || — || align=right | 1.0 km || 
|-id=150 bgcolor=#fefefe
| 227150 ||  || — || August 4, 2005 || Palomar || NEAT || — || align=right data-sort-value="0.88" | 880 m || 
|-id=151 bgcolor=#fefefe
| 227151 Desargues ||  ||  || August 10, 2005 || Saint-Sulpice || B. Christophe || MAS || align=right data-sort-value="0.81" | 810 m || 
|-id=152 bgcolor=#fefefe
| 227152 Zupi ||  ||  || August 5, 2005 || Vallemare di Borbona || V. S. Casulli || — || align=right data-sort-value="0.87" | 870 m || 
|-id=153 bgcolor=#fefefe
| 227153 ||  || — || August 9, 2005 || Socorro || LINEAR || — || align=right | 1.7 km || 
|-id=154 bgcolor=#fefefe
| 227154 ||  || — || August 22, 2005 || Palomar || NEAT || NYS || align=right data-sort-value="0.70" | 700 m || 
|-id=155 bgcolor=#fefefe
| 227155 ||  || — || August 24, 2005 || Palomar || NEAT || NYS || align=right data-sort-value="0.87" | 870 m || 
|-id=156 bgcolor=#fefefe
| 227156 ||  || — || August 25, 2005 || Palomar || NEAT || NYS || align=right data-sort-value="0.84" | 840 m || 
|-id=157 bgcolor=#fefefe
| 227157 ||  || — || August 26, 2005 || Campo Imperatore || CINEOS || — || align=right | 1.3 km || 
|-id=158 bgcolor=#fefefe
| 227158 ||  || — || August 22, 2005 || Siding Spring || SSS || ERI || align=right | 2.8 km || 
|-id=159 bgcolor=#E9E9E9
| 227159 ||  || — || August 24, 2005 || Palomar || NEAT || — || align=right | 1.5 km || 
|-id=160 bgcolor=#fefefe
| 227160 ||  || — || August 24, 2005 || Palomar || NEAT || — || align=right | 1.1 km || 
|-id=161 bgcolor=#fefefe
| 227161 ||  || — || August 24, 2005 || Palomar || NEAT || — || align=right | 1.1 km || 
|-id=162 bgcolor=#fefefe
| 227162 ||  || — || August 25, 2005 || Palomar || NEAT || NYS || align=right data-sort-value="0.70" | 700 m || 
|-id=163 bgcolor=#fefefe
| 227163 ||  || — || August 25, 2005 || Palomar || NEAT || — || align=right | 1.0 km || 
|-id=164 bgcolor=#fefefe
| 227164 ||  || — || August 27, 2005 || Kitt Peak || Spacewatch || NYS || align=right data-sort-value="0.73" | 730 m || 
|-id=165 bgcolor=#fefefe
| 227165 ||  || — || August 25, 2005 || Palomar || NEAT || — || align=right | 1.4 km || 
|-id=166 bgcolor=#fefefe
| 227166 ||  || — || August 25, 2005 || Palomar || NEAT || — || align=right | 1.0 km || 
|-id=167 bgcolor=#fefefe
| 227167 ||  || — || August 25, 2005 || Palomar || NEAT || ERI || align=right | 2.7 km || 
|-id=168 bgcolor=#fefefe
| 227168 ||  || — || August 25, 2005 || Palomar || NEAT || NYS || align=right data-sort-value="0.83" | 830 m || 
|-id=169 bgcolor=#fefefe
| 227169 ||  || — || August 25, 2005 || Palomar || NEAT || — || align=right | 1.5 km || 
|-id=170 bgcolor=#fefefe
| 227170 ||  || — || August 25, 2005 || Campo Imperatore || CINEOS || — || align=right | 1.1 km || 
|-id=171 bgcolor=#E9E9E9
| 227171 ||  || — || August 26, 2005 || Anderson Mesa || LONEOS || — || align=right | 2.5 km || 
|-id=172 bgcolor=#fefefe
| 227172 ||  || — || August 26, 2005 || Anderson Mesa || LONEOS || — || align=right data-sort-value="0.98" | 980 m || 
|-id=173 bgcolor=#fefefe
| 227173 ||  || — || August 26, 2005 || Anderson Mesa || LONEOS || FLO || align=right data-sort-value="0.93" | 930 m || 
|-id=174 bgcolor=#fefefe
| 227174 ||  || — || August 26, 2005 || Anderson Mesa || LONEOS || — || align=right data-sort-value="0.99" | 990 m || 
|-id=175 bgcolor=#fefefe
| 227175 ||  || — || August 26, 2005 || Anderson Mesa || LONEOS || MAS || align=right | 1.0 km || 
|-id=176 bgcolor=#fefefe
| 227176 ||  || — || August 26, 2005 || Palomar || NEAT || — || align=right | 1.2 km || 
|-id=177 bgcolor=#fefefe
| 227177 ||  || — || August 26, 2005 || Palomar || NEAT || V || align=right data-sort-value="0.83" | 830 m || 
|-id=178 bgcolor=#fefefe
| 227178 ||  || — || August 26, 2005 || Palomar || NEAT || MAS || align=right | 2.3 km || 
|-id=179 bgcolor=#fefefe
| 227179 ||  || — || August 26, 2005 || Palomar || NEAT || NYS || align=right data-sort-value="0.88" | 880 m || 
|-id=180 bgcolor=#fefefe
| 227180 ||  || — || August 26, 2005 || Palomar || NEAT || NYS || align=right | 1.1 km || 
|-id=181 bgcolor=#fefefe
| 227181 ||  || — || August 26, 2005 || Palomar || NEAT || NYS || align=right data-sort-value="0.89" | 890 m || 
|-id=182 bgcolor=#fefefe
| 227182 ||  || — || August 27, 2005 || Siding Spring || SSS || EUT || align=right data-sort-value="0.82" | 820 m || 
|-id=183 bgcolor=#fefefe
| 227183 ||  || — || August 28, 2005 || Kitt Peak || Spacewatch || NYS || align=right data-sort-value="0.79" | 790 m || 
|-id=184 bgcolor=#fefefe
| 227184 ||  || — || August 28, 2005 || Anderson Mesa || LONEOS || MAS || align=right data-sort-value="0.92" | 920 m || 
|-id=185 bgcolor=#fefefe
| 227185 ||  || — || August 28, 2005 || Kitt Peak || Spacewatch || NYS || align=right data-sort-value="0.89" | 890 m || 
|-id=186 bgcolor=#fefefe
| 227186 ||  || — || August 28, 2005 || Kitt Peak || Spacewatch || NYS || align=right data-sort-value="0.90" | 900 m || 
|-id=187 bgcolor=#fefefe
| 227187 ||  || — || August 24, 2005 || Palomar || NEAT || NYS || align=right data-sort-value="0.88" | 880 m || 
|-id=188 bgcolor=#fefefe
| 227188 ||  || — || August 26, 2005 || Palomar || NEAT || V || align=right | 1.0 km || 
|-id=189 bgcolor=#fefefe
| 227189 ||  || — || August 28, 2005 || Kitt Peak || Spacewatch || NYS || align=right data-sort-value="0.76" | 760 m || 
|-id=190 bgcolor=#fefefe
| 227190 ||  || — || August 28, 2005 || Siding Spring || SSS || — || align=right | 1.2 km || 
|-id=191 bgcolor=#fefefe
| 227191 ||  || — || August 28, 2005 || Siding Spring || SSS || — || align=right | 1.4 km || 
|-id=192 bgcolor=#fefefe
| 227192 ||  || — || August 29, 2005 || Kitt Peak || Spacewatch || — || align=right | 1.1 km || 
|-id=193 bgcolor=#fefefe
| 227193 ||  || — || August 29, 2005 || Socorro || LINEAR || NYS || align=right data-sort-value="0.99" | 990 m || 
|-id=194 bgcolor=#fefefe
| 227194 ||  || — || August 29, 2005 || Anderson Mesa || LONEOS || MAS || align=right data-sort-value="0.99" | 990 m || 
|-id=195 bgcolor=#fefefe
| 227195 ||  || — || August 29, 2005 || Anderson Mesa || LONEOS || — || align=right data-sort-value="0.95" | 950 m || 
|-id=196 bgcolor=#E9E9E9
| 227196 ||  || — || August 29, 2005 || Jarnac || Jarnac Obs. || — || align=right | 1.4 km || 
|-id=197 bgcolor=#fefefe
| 227197 ||  || — || August 25, 2005 || Palomar || NEAT || — || align=right | 1.2 km || 
|-id=198 bgcolor=#fefefe
| 227198 ||  || — || August 29, 2005 || Anderson Mesa || LONEOS || V || align=right data-sort-value="0.89" | 890 m || 
|-id=199 bgcolor=#fefefe
| 227199 ||  || — || August 27, 2005 || Palomar || NEAT || — || align=right | 1.4 km || 
|-id=200 bgcolor=#fefefe
| 227200 ||  || — || August 27, 2005 || Palomar || NEAT || NYS || align=right | 1.0 km || 
|}

227201–227300 

|-bgcolor=#fefefe
| 227201 ||  || — || August 27, 2005 || Palomar || NEAT || — || align=right | 1.00 km || 
|-id=202 bgcolor=#fefefe
| 227202 ||  || — || August 27, 2005 || Palomar || NEAT || V || align=right data-sort-value="0.96" | 960 m || 
|-id=203 bgcolor=#fefefe
| 227203 ||  || — || August 27, 2005 || Palomar || NEAT || — || align=right | 2.0 km || 
|-id=204 bgcolor=#fefefe
| 227204 ||  || — || August 28, 2005 || Kitt Peak || Spacewatch || MAS || align=right data-sort-value="0.71" | 710 m || 
|-id=205 bgcolor=#fefefe
| 227205 ||  || — || August 28, 2005 || Kitt Peak || Spacewatch || NYS || align=right data-sort-value="0.86" | 860 m || 
|-id=206 bgcolor=#fefefe
| 227206 ||  || — || August 27, 2005 || Palomar || NEAT || — || align=right | 1.3 km || 
|-id=207 bgcolor=#fefefe
| 227207 ||  || — || August 27, 2005 || Anderson Mesa || LONEOS || ERI || align=right | 2.9 km || 
|-id=208 bgcolor=#fefefe
| 227208 ||  || — || August 28, 2005 || Siding Spring || SSS || V || align=right data-sort-value="0.92" | 920 m || 
|-id=209 bgcolor=#fefefe
| 227209 ||  || — || August 27, 2005 || Kitt Peak || Spacewatch || NYS || align=right data-sort-value="0.93" | 930 m || 
|-id=210 bgcolor=#fefefe
| 227210 ||  || — || August 31, 2005 || Kitt Peak || Spacewatch || — || align=right | 1.5 km || 
|-id=211 bgcolor=#fefefe
| 227211 ||  || — || August 30, 2005 || Palomar || NEAT || CIM || align=right | 3.6 km || 
|-id=212 bgcolor=#fefefe
| 227212 ||  || — || August 28, 2005 || Anderson Mesa || LONEOS || — || align=right | 2.6 km || 
|-id=213 bgcolor=#fefefe
| 227213 ||  || — || August 31, 2005 || Palomar || NEAT || — || align=right | 3.1 km || 
|-id=214 bgcolor=#fefefe
| 227214 ||  || — || August 31, 2005 || Anderson Mesa || LONEOS || NYS || align=right data-sort-value="0.89" | 890 m || 
|-id=215 bgcolor=#fefefe
| 227215 ||  || — || August 26, 2005 || Palomar || NEAT || V || align=right data-sort-value="0.86" | 860 m || 
|-id=216 bgcolor=#fefefe
| 227216 ||  || — || August 24, 2005 || Palomar || NEAT || — || align=right | 1.1 km || 
|-id=217 bgcolor=#fefefe
| 227217 ||  || — || August 31, 2005 || Kitt Peak || Spacewatch || — || align=right data-sort-value="0.87" | 870 m || 
|-id=218 bgcolor=#fefefe
| 227218 Rényi ||  ||  || September 5, 2005 || Piszkéstető || K. Sárneczky || MAS || align=right data-sort-value="0.93" | 930 m || 
|-id=219 bgcolor=#fefefe
| 227219 ||  || — || September 7, 2005 || Uccle || T. Pauwels || NYS || align=right data-sort-value="0.86" | 860 m || 
|-id=220 bgcolor=#fefefe
| 227220 ||  || — || September 8, 2005 || Socorro || LINEAR || NYS || align=right data-sort-value="0.84" | 840 m || 
|-id=221 bgcolor=#E9E9E9
| 227221 ||  || — || September 8, 2005 || Socorro || LINEAR || — || align=right | 2.2 km || 
|-id=222 bgcolor=#fefefe
| 227222 ||  || — || September 8, 2005 || Socorro || LINEAR || — || align=right | 1.1 km || 
|-id=223 bgcolor=#fefefe
| 227223 ||  || — || September 1, 2005 || Campo Imperatore || CINEOS || — || align=right | 1.4 km || 
|-id=224 bgcolor=#fefefe
| 227224 ||  || — || September 6, 2005 || Socorro || LINEAR || — || align=right data-sort-value="0.95" | 950 m || 
|-id=225 bgcolor=#fefefe
| 227225 ||  || — || September 12, 2005 || Jarnac || Jarnac Obs. || — || align=right data-sort-value="0.95" | 950 m || 
|-id=226 bgcolor=#fefefe
| 227226 ||  || — || September 8, 2005 || Socorro || LINEAR || MAS || align=right data-sort-value="0.88" | 880 m || 
|-id=227 bgcolor=#fefefe
| 227227 ||  || — || September 8, 2005 || Socorro || LINEAR || NYS || align=right data-sort-value="0.76" | 760 m || 
|-id=228 bgcolor=#fefefe
| 227228 ||  || — || September 11, 2005 || Socorro || LINEAR || — || align=right | 1.4 km || 
|-id=229 bgcolor=#fefefe
| 227229 ||  || — || September 5, 2005 || Catalina || CSS || MAS || align=right data-sort-value="0.94" | 940 m || 
|-id=230 bgcolor=#fefefe
| 227230 ||  || — || September 12, 2005 || Kitt Peak || Spacewatch || NYS || align=right data-sort-value="0.97" | 970 m || 
|-id=231 bgcolor=#fefefe
| 227231 ||  || — || September 14, 2005 || Kitt Peak || Spacewatch || — || align=right data-sort-value="0.98" | 980 m || 
|-id=232 bgcolor=#fefefe
| 227232 ||  || — || September 23, 2005 || Catalina || CSS || NYS || align=right | 1.2 km || 
|-id=233 bgcolor=#fefefe
| 227233 ||  || — || September 23, 2005 || Catalina || CSS || NYS || align=right data-sort-value="0.85" | 850 m || 
|-id=234 bgcolor=#fefefe
| 227234 ||  || — || September 23, 2005 || Catalina || CSS || NYS || align=right | 1.1 km || 
|-id=235 bgcolor=#fefefe
| 227235 ||  || — || September 23, 2005 || Kitt Peak || Spacewatch || — || align=right data-sort-value="0.97" | 970 m || 
|-id=236 bgcolor=#fefefe
| 227236 ||  || — || September 25, 2005 || Catalina || CSS || — || align=right | 2.2 km || 
|-id=237 bgcolor=#fefefe
| 227237 ||  || — || September 23, 2005 || Kitt Peak || Spacewatch || — || align=right | 1.1 km || 
|-id=238 bgcolor=#fefefe
| 227238 ||  || — || September 23, 2005 || Kitt Peak || Spacewatch || — || align=right | 1.1 km || 
|-id=239 bgcolor=#fefefe
| 227239 ||  || — || September 23, 2005 || Kitt Peak || Spacewatch || MAS || align=right data-sort-value="0.96" | 960 m || 
|-id=240 bgcolor=#fefefe
| 227240 ||  || — || September 23, 2005 || Kitt Peak || Spacewatch || NYS || align=right data-sort-value="0.83" | 830 m || 
|-id=241 bgcolor=#fefefe
| 227241 ||  || — || September 23, 2005 || Kitt Peak || Spacewatch || — || align=right | 1.1 km || 
|-id=242 bgcolor=#fefefe
| 227242 ||  || — || September 23, 2005 || Kitt Peak || Spacewatch || NYS || align=right data-sort-value="0.85" | 850 m || 
|-id=243 bgcolor=#fefefe
| 227243 ||  || — || September 24, 2005 || Kitt Peak || Spacewatch || — || align=right | 1.2 km || 
|-id=244 bgcolor=#fefefe
| 227244 ||  || — || September 24, 2005 || Kitt Peak || Spacewatch || — || align=right | 1.1 km || 
|-id=245 bgcolor=#E9E9E9
| 227245 ||  || — || September 24, 2005 || Kitt Peak || Spacewatch || — || align=right | 2.1 km || 
|-id=246 bgcolor=#fefefe
| 227246 ||  || — || September 24, 2005 || Kitt Peak || Spacewatch || V || align=right data-sort-value="0.95" | 950 m || 
|-id=247 bgcolor=#fefefe
| 227247 ||  || — || September 24, 2005 || Kitt Peak || Spacewatch || fast? || align=right | 1.1 km || 
|-id=248 bgcolor=#fefefe
| 227248 ||  || — || September 25, 2005 || Kitt Peak || Spacewatch || MAS || align=right | 1.1 km || 
|-id=249 bgcolor=#fefefe
| 227249 ||  || — || September 25, 2005 || Kitt Peak || Spacewatch || NYS || align=right data-sort-value="0.66" | 660 m || 
|-id=250 bgcolor=#fefefe
| 227250 ||  || — || September 26, 2005 || Kitt Peak || Spacewatch || NYS || align=right data-sort-value="0.79" | 790 m || 
|-id=251 bgcolor=#fefefe
| 227251 ||  || — || September 26, 2005 || Kitt Peak || Spacewatch || V || align=right data-sort-value="0.95" | 950 m || 
|-id=252 bgcolor=#fefefe
| 227252 ||  || — || September 24, 2005 || Kitt Peak || Spacewatch || — || align=right | 1.7 km || 
|-id=253 bgcolor=#fefefe
| 227253 ||  || — || September 24, 2005 || Kitt Peak || Spacewatch || — || align=right data-sort-value="0.80" | 800 m || 
|-id=254 bgcolor=#fefefe
| 227254 ||  || — || September 24, 2005 || Kitt Peak || Spacewatch || — || align=right | 2.1 km || 
|-id=255 bgcolor=#fefefe
| 227255 ||  || — || September 24, 2005 || Kitt Peak || Spacewatch || NYS || align=right data-sort-value="0.74" | 740 m || 
|-id=256 bgcolor=#fefefe
| 227256 ||  || — || September 24, 2005 || Kitt Peak || Spacewatch || — || align=right data-sort-value="0.91" | 910 m || 
|-id=257 bgcolor=#E9E9E9
| 227257 ||  || — || September 24, 2005 || Kitt Peak || Spacewatch || — || align=right | 1.2 km || 
|-id=258 bgcolor=#fefefe
| 227258 ||  || — || September 24, 2005 || Kitt Peak || Spacewatch || — || align=right | 1.1 km || 
|-id=259 bgcolor=#E9E9E9
| 227259 ||  || — || September 24, 2005 || Kitt Peak || Spacewatch || — || align=right | 1.6 km || 
|-id=260 bgcolor=#fefefe
| 227260 ||  || — || September 24, 2005 || Kitt Peak || Spacewatch || — || align=right | 1.1 km || 
|-id=261 bgcolor=#fefefe
| 227261 ||  || — || September 24, 2005 || Kitt Peak || Spacewatch || — || align=right | 1.9 km || 
|-id=262 bgcolor=#fefefe
| 227262 ||  || — || September 25, 2005 || Kitt Peak || Spacewatch || FLO || align=right | 1.0 km || 
|-id=263 bgcolor=#fefefe
| 227263 ||  || — || September 27, 2005 || Kitt Peak || Spacewatch || — || align=right data-sort-value="0.91" | 910 m || 
|-id=264 bgcolor=#fefefe
| 227264 ||  || — || September 27, 2005 || Kitt Peak || Spacewatch || MAS || align=right data-sort-value="0.76" | 760 m || 
|-id=265 bgcolor=#E9E9E9
| 227265 ||  || — || September 29, 2005 || Kitt Peak || Spacewatch || — || align=right | 1.0 km || 
|-id=266 bgcolor=#fefefe
| 227266 ||  || — || September 29, 2005 || Kitt Peak || Spacewatch || MAS || align=right | 1.0 km || 
|-id=267 bgcolor=#E9E9E9
| 227267 ||  || — || September 29, 2005 || Anderson Mesa || LONEOS || — || align=right | 1.2 km || 
|-id=268 bgcolor=#fefefe
| 227268 ||  || — || September 29, 2005 || Anderson Mesa || LONEOS || MAS || align=right | 1.2 km || 
|-id=269 bgcolor=#fefefe
| 227269 ||  || — || September 29, 2005 || Mount Lemmon || Mount Lemmon Survey || MAS || align=right data-sort-value="0.76" | 760 m || 
|-id=270 bgcolor=#fefefe
| 227270 ||  || — || September 29, 2005 || Mount Lemmon || Mount Lemmon Survey || NYS || align=right data-sort-value="0.98" | 980 m || 
|-id=271 bgcolor=#fefefe
| 227271 ||  || — || September 29, 2005 || Mount Lemmon || Mount Lemmon Survey || MAS || align=right data-sort-value="0.87" | 870 m || 
|-id=272 bgcolor=#fefefe
| 227272 ||  || — || September 29, 2005 || Kitt Peak || Spacewatch || — || align=right | 1.1 km || 
|-id=273 bgcolor=#fefefe
| 227273 ||  || — || September 24, 2005 || Kitt Peak || Spacewatch || NYS || align=right data-sort-value="0.74" | 740 m || 
|-id=274 bgcolor=#fefefe
| 227274 ||  || — || September 25, 2005 || Kitt Peak || Spacewatch || MAS || align=right data-sort-value="0.74" | 740 m || 
|-id=275 bgcolor=#fefefe
| 227275 ||  || — || September 25, 2005 || Kitt Peak || Spacewatch || — || align=right | 2.1 km || 
|-id=276 bgcolor=#fefefe
| 227276 ||  || — || September 25, 2005 || Palomar || NEAT || — || align=right | 1.2 km || 
|-id=277 bgcolor=#fefefe
| 227277 ||  || — || September 25, 2005 || Kitt Peak || Spacewatch || — || align=right data-sort-value="0.87" | 870 m || 
|-id=278 bgcolor=#fefefe
| 227278 ||  || — || September 27, 2005 || Kitt Peak || Spacewatch || V || align=right data-sort-value="0.70" | 700 m || 
|-id=279 bgcolor=#fefefe
| 227279 ||  || — || September 27, 2005 || Kitt Peak || Spacewatch || NYS || align=right data-sort-value="0.90" | 900 m || 
|-id=280 bgcolor=#fefefe
| 227280 ||  || — || September 27, 2005 || Kitt Peak || Spacewatch || MAS || align=right data-sort-value="0.89" | 890 m || 
|-id=281 bgcolor=#fefefe
| 227281 ||  || — || September 27, 2005 || Kitt Peak || Spacewatch || MAS || align=right data-sort-value="0.77" | 770 m || 
|-id=282 bgcolor=#fefefe
| 227282 ||  || — || September 28, 2005 || Palomar || NEAT || — || align=right | 1.6 km || 
|-id=283 bgcolor=#fefefe
| 227283 ||  || — || September 29, 2005 || Kitt Peak || Spacewatch || — || align=right | 1.3 km || 
|-id=284 bgcolor=#fefefe
| 227284 ||  || — || September 29, 2005 || Kitt Peak || Spacewatch || — || align=right | 2.4 km || 
|-id=285 bgcolor=#fefefe
| 227285 ||  || — || September 29, 2005 || Kitt Peak || Spacewatch || NYS || align=right data-sort-value="0.84" | 840 m || 
|-id=286 bgcolor=#fefefe
| 227286 ||  || — || September 29, 2005 || Anderson Mesa || LONEOS || — || align=right | 1.2 km || 
|-id=287 bgcolor=#fefefe
| 227287 ||  || — || September 29, 2005 || Anderson Mesa || LONEOS || MAS || align=right data-sort-value="0.89" | 890 m || 
|-id=288 bgcolor=#fefefe
| 227288 ||  || — || September 29, 2005 || Anderson Mesa || LONEOS || MAS || align=right data-sort-value="0.91" | 910 m || 
|-id=289 bgcolor=#fefefe
| 227289 ||  || — || September 29, 2005 || Kitt Peak || Spacewatch || — || align=right data-sort-value="0.91" | 910 m || 
|-id=290 bgcolor=#E9E9E9
| 227290 ||  || — || September 29, 2005 || Anderson Mesa || LONEOS || — || align=right | 1.2 km || 
|-id=291 bgcolor=#fefefe
| 227291 ||  || — || September 30, 2005 || Kitt Peak || Spacewatch || — || align=right | 2.1 km || 
|-id=292 bgcolor=#fefefe
| 227292 ||  || — || September 30, 2005 || Anderson Mesa || LONEOS || — || align=right | 3.2 km || 
|-id=293 bgcolor=#E9E9E9
| 227293 ||  || — || September 30, 2005 || Kitt Peak || Spacewatch || MAR || align=right | 1.6 km || 
|-id=294 bgcolor=#fefefe
| 227294 ||  || — || September 30, 2005 || Catalina || CSS || — || align=right | 1.7 km || 
|-id=295 bgcolor=#E9E9E9
| 227295 ||  || — || September 30, 2005 || Mount Lemmon || Mount Lemmon Survey || — || align=right | 1.6 km || 
|-id=296 bgcolor=#fefefe
| 227296 ||  || — || September 29, 2005 || Kitt Peak || Spacewatch || NYS || align=right | 1.1 km || 
|-id=297 bgcolor=#fefefe
| 227297 ||  || — || September 30, 2005 || Mount Lemmon || Mount Lemmon Survey || — || align=right | 1.5 km || 
|-id=298 bgcolor=#fefefe
| 227298 ||  || — || September 30, 2005 || Kitt Peak || Spacewatch || — || align=right data-sort-value="0.87" | 870 m || 
|-id=299 bgcolor=#fefefe
| 227299 ||  || — || September 24, 2005 || Palomar || NEAT || ERI || align=right | 2.6 km || 
|-id=300 bgcolor=#fefefe
| 227300 ||  || — || September 22, 2005 || Palomar || NEAT || NYS || align=right data-sort-value="0.90" | 900 m || 
|}

227301–227400 

|-bgcolor=#fefefe
| 227301 ||  || — || September 22, 2005 || Palomar || NEAT || — || align=right | 1.2 km || 
|-id=302 bgcolor=#fefefe
| 227302 ||  || — || September 28, 2005 || Palomar || NEAT || MAS || align=right data-sort-value="0.91" | 910 m || 
|-id=303 bgcolor=#fefefe
| 227303 ||  || — || September 29, 2005 || Anderson Mesa || LONEOS || — || align=right data-sort-value="0.96" | 960 m || 
|-id=304 bgcolor=#fefefe
| 227304 ||  || — || September 29, 2005 || Anderson Mesa || LONEOS || — || align=right | 1.5 km || 
|-id=305 bgcolor=#fefefe
| 227305 ||  || — || September 27, 2005 || Kitt Peak || Spacewatch || — || align=right | 1.0 km || 
|-id=306 bgcolor=#E9E9E9
| 227306 ||  || — || October 1, 2005 || Kitt Peak || Spacewatch || — || align=right | 2.3 km || 
|-id=307 bgcolor=#fefefe
| 227307 ||  || — || October 1, 2005 || Mount Lemmon || Mount Lemmon Survey || NYS || align=right | 1.1 km || 
|-id=308 bgcolor=#E9E9E9
| 227308 ||  || — || October 1, 2005 || Anderson Mesa || LONEOS || — || align=right | 2.1 km || 
|-id=309 bgcolor=#fefefe
| 227309 ||  || — || October 1, 2005 || Mount Lemmon || Mount Lemmon Survey || NYS || align=right data-sort-value="0.79" | 790 m || 
|-id=310 bgcolor=#E9E9E9
| 227310 Scottkardel ||  ||  || October 2, 2005 || Catalina || R. A. Kowalski || MAR || align=right | 1.1 km || 
|-id=311 bgcolor=#fefefe
| 227311 ||  || — || October 1, 2005 || Socorro || LINEAR || NYS || align=right data-sort-value="0.88" | 880 m || 
|-id=312 bgcolor=#fefefe
| 227312 ||  || — || October 1, 2005 || Socorro || LINEAR || NYS || align=right data-sort-value="0.86" | 860 m || 
|-id=313 bgcolor=#fefefe
| 227313 ||  || — || October 1, 2005 || Kitt Peak || Spacewatch || NYS || align=right data-sort-value="0.74" | 740 m || 
|-id=314 bgcolor=#E9E9E9
| 227314 ||  || — || October 3, 2005 || Kitt Peak || Spacewatch || PAE || align=right | 3.7 km || 
|-id=315 bgcolor=#E9E9E9
| 227315 ||  || — || October 4, 2005 || Mount Lemmon || Mount Lemmon Survey || — || align=right | 1.0 km || 
|-id=316 bgcolor=#fefefe
| 227316 ||  || — || October 4, 2005 || Mount Lemmon || Mount Lemmon Survey || MAS || align=right data-sort-value="0.96" | 960 m || 
|-id=317 bgcolor=#fefefe
| 227317 ||  || — || October 6, 2005 || Kitt Peak || Spacewatch || — || align=right | 1.2 km || 
|-id=318 bgcolor=#E9E9E9
| 227318 ||  || — || October 5, 2005 || Kitt Peak || Spacewatch || — || align=right | 1.9 km || 
|-id=319 bgcolor=#fefefe
| 227319 ||  || — || October 5, 2005 || Catalina || CSS || — || align=right data-sort-value="0.83" | 830 m || 
|-id=320 bgcolor=#fefefe
| 227320 ||  || — || October 6, 2005 || Mount Lemmon || Mount Lemmon Survey || NYS || align=right data-sort-value="0.85" | 850 m || 
|-id=321 bgcolor=#fefefe
| 227321 ||  || — || October 10, 2005 || Kitt Peak || Spacewatch || — || align=right data-sort-value="0.94" | 940 m || 
|-id=322 bgcolor=#fefefe
| 227322 ||  || — || October 7, 2005 || Catalina || CSS || — || align=right | 1.1 km || 
|-id=323 bgcolor=#fefefe
| 227323 ||  || — || October 7, 2005 || Kitt Peak || Spacewatch || — || align=right | 1.4 km || 
|-id=324 bgcolor=#fefefe
| 227324 ||  || — || October 6, 2005 || Kitt Peak || Spacewatch || MAS || align=right data-sort-value="0.94" | 940 m || 
|-id=325 bgcolor=#fefefe
| 227325 ||  || — || October 8, 2005 || Kitt Peak || Spacewatch || — || align=right | 1.0 km || 
|-id=326 bgcolor=#fefefe
| 227326 Narodychi ||  ||  || October 11, 2005 || Andrushivka || Andrushivka Obs. || MAS || align=right | 1.1 km || 
|-id=327 bgcolor=#fefefe
| 227327 ||  || — || October 9, 2005 || Kitt Peak || Spacewatch || — || align=right data-sort-value="0.94" | 940 m || 
|-id=328 bgcolor=#E9E9E9
| 227328 ||  || — || October 10, 2005 || Kitt Peak || Spacewatch || WIT || align=right | 1.6 km || 
|-id=329 bgcolor=#fefefe
| 227329 ||  || — || October 1, 2005 || Kitt Peak || Spacewatch || — || align=right data-sort-value="0.95" | 950 m || 
|-id=330 bgcolor=#fefefe
| 227330 || 2005 UM || — || October 23, 2005 || Socorro || LINEAR || — || align=right | 2.2 km || 
|-id=331 bgcolor=#E9E9E9
| 227331 || 2005 UW || — || October 23, 2005 || Wrightwood || J. W. Young || — || align=right | 3.4 km || 
|-id=332 bgcolor=#E9E9E9
| 227332 ||  || — || October 23, 2005 || Junk Bond || D. Healy || AGN || align=right | 1.4 km || 
|-id=333 bgcolor=#fefefe
| 227333 ||  || — || October 23, 2005 || Goodricke-Pigott || R. A. Tucker || — || align=right | 1.3 km || 
|-id=334 bgcolor=#E9E9E9
| 227334 ||  || — || October 24, 2005 || Goodricke-Pigott || R. A. Tucker || EUN || align=right | 2.0 km || 
|-id=335 bgcolor=#fefefe
| 227335 ||  || — || October 25, 2005 || Nashville || R. Clingan || — || align=right | 1.0 km || 
|-id=336 bgcolor=#fefefe
| 227336 ||  || — || October 27, 2005 || Mayhill || E. Guido || — || align=right | 1.5 km || 
|-id=337 bgcolor=#fefefe
| 227337 ||  || — || October 27, 2005 || Ottmarsheim || C. Rinner || NYS || align=right | 1.00 km || 
|-id=338 bgcolor=#fefefe
| 227338 ||  || — || October 20, 2005 || Palomar || NEAT || NYS || align=right data-sort-value="0.92" | 920 m || 
|-id=339 bgcolor=#E9E9E9
| 227339 ||  || — || October 23, 2005 || Catalina || CSS || — || align=right | 2.0 km || 
|-id=340 bgcolor=#E9E9E9
| 227340 ||  || — || October 23, 2005 || Catalina || CSS || — || align=right | 3.3 km || 
|-id=341 bgcolor=#fefefe
| 227341 ||  || — || October 23, 2005 || Catalina || CSS || NYS || align=right | 1.2 km || 
|-id=342 bgcolor=#E9E9E9
| 227342 ||  || — || October 24, 2005 || Kitt Peak || Spacewatch || — || align=right | 3.3 km || 
|-id=343 bgcolor=#E9E9E9
| 227343 ||  || — || October 24, 2005 || Kitt Peak || Spacewatch || — || align=right | 1.2 km || 
|-id=344 bgcolor=#E9E9E9
| 227344 ||  || — || October 25, 2005 || Mount Lemmon || Mount Lemmon Survey || — || align=right | 1.5 km || 
|-id=345 bgcolor=#fefefe
| 227345 ||  || — || October 22, 2005 || Palomar || NEAT || — || align=right | 1.5 km || 
|-id=346 bgcolor=#E9E9E9
| 227346 ||  || — || October 22, 2005 || Kitt Peak || Spacewatch || — || align=right | 1.2 km || 
|-id=347 bgcolor=#fefefe
| 227347 ||  || — || October 23, 2005 || Palomar || NEAT || NYS || align=right | 1.1 km || 
|-id=348 bgcolor=#E9E9E9
| 227348 ||  || — || October 25, 2005 || Catalina || CSS || MAR || align=right | 1.7 km || 
|-id=349 bgcolor=#E9E9E9
| 227349 ||  || — || October 25, 2005 || Catalina || CSS || — || align=right | 1.5 km || 
|-id=350 bgcolor=#E9E9E9
| 227350 ||  || — || October 27, 2005 || Mount Lemmon || Mount Lemmon Survey || KON || align=right | 3.0 km || 
|-id=351 bgcolor=#E9E9E9
| 227351 ||  || — || October 22, 2005 || Kitt Peak || Spacewatch || — || align=right | 1.5 km || 
|-id=352 bgcolor=#E9E9E9
| 227352 ||  || — || October 22, 2005 || Kitt Peak || Spacewatch || PAD || align=right | 2.1 km || 
|-id=353 bgcolor=#E9E9E9
| 227353 ||  || — || October 22, 2005 || Kitt Peak || Spacewatch || HEN || align=right | 1.2 km || 
|-id=354 bgcolor=#E9E9E9
| 227354 ||  || — || October 22, 2005 || Kitt Peak || Spacewatch || — || align=right | 1.1 km || 
|-id=355 bgcolor=#E9E9E9
| 227355 ||  || — || October 22, 2005 || Kitt Peak || Spacewatch || — || align=right | 1.4 km || 
|-id=356 bgcolor=#fefefe
| 227356 ||  || — || October 24, 2005 || Kitt Peak || Spacewatch || NYS || align=right data-sort-value="0.90" | 900 m || 
|-id=357 bgcolor=#E9E9E9
| 227357 ||  || — || October 24, 2005 || Kitt Peak || Spacewatch || — || align=right | 1.9 km || 
|-id=358 bgcolor=#E9E9E9
| 227358 ||  || — || October 24, 2005 || Kitt Peak || Spacewatch || — || align=right | 1.3 km || 
|-id=359 bgcolor=#E9E9E9
| 227359 ||  || — || October 24, 2005 || Palomar || NEAT || — || align=right | 1.7 km || 
|-id=360 bgcolor=#E9E9E9
| 227360 ||  || — || October 25, 2005 || Mount Lemmon || Mount Lemmon Survey || — || align=right | 1.0 km || 
|-id=361 bgcolor=#fefefe
| 227361 ||  || — || October 26, 2005 || Kitt Peak || Spacewatch || V || align=right | 1.1 km || 
|-id=362 bgcolor=#E9E9E9
| 227362 ||  || — || October 26, 2005 || Kitt Peak || Spacewatch || — || align=right | 1.4 km || 
|-id=363 bgcolor=#fefefe
| 227363 ||  || — || October 22, 2005 || Catalina || CSS || V || align=right | 1.1 km || 
|-id=364 bgcolor=#E9E9E9
| 227364 ||  || — || October 24, 2005 || Kitt Peak || Spacewatch || — || align=right | 1.0 km || 
|-id=365 bgcolor=#fefefe
| 227365 ||  || — || October 24, 2005 || Kitt Peak || Spacewatch || — || align=right | 1.3 km || 
|-id=366 bgcolor=#fefefe
| 227366 ||  || — || October 24, 2005 || Kitt Peak || Spacewatch || ERI || align=right | 3.0 km || 
|-id=367 bgcolor=#E9E9E9
| 227367 ||  || — || October 24, 2005 || Kitt Peak || Spacewatch || — || align=right | 1.2 km || 
|-id=368 bgcolor=#fefefe
| 227368 ||  || — || October 24, 2005 || Kitt Peak || Spacewatch || — || align=right | 1.3 km || 
|-id=369 bgcolor=#E9E9E9
| 227369 ||  || — || October 24, 2005 || Kitt Peak || Spacewatch || — || align=right | 1.3 km || 
|-id=370 bgcolor=#E9E9E9
| 227370 ||  || — || October 27, 2005 || Mount Lemmon || Mount Lemmon Survey || — || align=right | 1.5 km || 
|-id=371 bgcolor=#E9E9E9
| 227371 ||  || — || October 27, 2005 || Mount Lemmon || Mount Lemmon Survey || — || align=right | 1.2 km || 
|-id=372 bgcolor=#fefefe
| 227372 ||  || — || October 25, 2005 || Mount Lemmon || Mount Lemmon Survey || MAS || align=right data-sort-value="0.76" | 760 m || 
|-id=373 bgcolor=#fefefe
| 227373 ||  || — || October 20, 2005 || Palomar || NEAT || FLO || align=right data-sort-value="0.95" | 950 m || 
|-id=374 bgcolor=#fefefe
| 227374 ||  || — || October 25, 2005 || Catalina || CSS || MAS || align=right | 1.0 km || 
|-id=375 bgcolor=#fefefe
| 227375 ||  || — || October 25, 2005 || Kitt Peak || Spacewatch || — || align=right | 1.1 km || 
|-id=376 bgcolor=#E9E9E9
| 227376 ||  || — || October 25, 2005 || Kitt Peak || Spacewatch || ADE || align=right | 2.7 km || 
|-id=377 bgcolor=#E9E9E9
| 227377 ||  || — || October 25, 2005 || Kitt Peak || Spacewatch || MAR || align=right | 1.4 km || 
|-id=378 bgcolor=#E9E9E9
| 227378 ||  || — || October 25, 2005 || Kitt Peak || Spacewatch || — || align=right | 2.0 km || 
|-id=379 bgcolor=#E9E9E9
| 227379 ||  || — || October 25, 2005 || Kitt Peak || Spacewatch || — || align=right | 1.7 km || 
|-id=380 bgcolor=#fefefe
| 227380 ||  || — || October 24, 2005 || Kitt Peak || Spacewatch || MAS || align=right data-sort-value="0.90" | 900 m || 
|-id=381 bgcolor=#fefefe
| 227381 ||  || — || October 25, 2005 || Mount Lemmon || Mount Lemmon Survey || — || align=right data-sort-value="0.89" | 890 m || 
|-id=382 bgcolor=#E9E9E9
| 227382 ||  || — || October 27, 2005 || Kitt Peak || Spacewatch || — || align=right | 1.4 km || 
|-id=383 bgcolor=#E9E9E9
| 227383 ||  || — || October 27, 2005 || Kitt Peak || Spacewatch || — || align=right | 2.8 km || 
|-id=384 bgcolor=#E9E9E9
| 227384 ||  || — || October 23, 2005 || Palomar || NEAT || — || align=right | 2.2 km || 
|-id=385 bgcolor=#fefefe
| 227385 ||  || — || October 26, 2005 || Kitt Peak || Spacewatch || — || align=right | 1.0 km || 
|-id=386 bgcolor=#E9E9E9
| 227386 ||  || — || October 26, 2005 || Kitt Peak || Spacewatch || — || align=right | 1.1 km || 
|-id=387 bgcolor=#E9E9E9
| 227387 ||  || — || October 26, 2005 || Kitt Peak || Spacewatch || — || align=right data-sort-value="0.94" | 940 m || 
|-id=388 bgcolor=#E9E9E9
| 227388 ||  || — || October 26, 2005 || Kitt Peak || Spacewatch || — || align=right | 3.0 km || 
|-id=389 bgcolor=#fefefe
| 227389 ||  || — || October 29, 2005 || Mount Lemmon || Mount Lemmon Survey || — || align=right data-sort-value="0.90" | 900 m || 
|-id=390 bgcolor=#E9E9E9
| 227390 ||  || — || October 29, 2005 || Mount Lemmon || Mount Lemmon Survey || — || align=right | 1.2 km || 
|-id=391 bgcolor=#fefefe
| 227391 ||  || — || October 27, 2005 || Kitt Peak || Spacewatch || — || align=right | 1.2 km || 
|-id=392 bgcolor=#fefefe
| 227392 ||  || — || October 31, 2005 || Catalina || CSS || — || align=right | 1.2 km || 
|-id=393 bgcolor=#E9E9E9
| 227393 ||  || — || October 29, 2005 || Mount Lemmon || Mount Lemmon Survey || — || align=right | 1.3 km || 
|-id=394 bgcolor=#E9E9E9
| 227394 ||  || — || October 29, 2005 || Catalina || CSS || — || align=right | 3.0 km || 
|-id=395 bgcolor=#fefefe
| 227395 ||  || — || October 27, 2005 || Kitt Peak || Spacewatch || NYS || align=right | 1.0 km || 
|-id=396 bgcolor=#E9E9E9
| 227396 ||  || — || October 27, 2005 || Kitt Peak || Spacewatch || — || align=right | 1.1 km || 
|-id=397 bgcolor=#fefefe
| 227397 ||  || — || October 28, 2005 || Mount Lemmon || Mount Lemmon Survey || — || align=right | 1.0 km || 
|-id=398 bgcolor=#fefefe
| 227398 ||  || — || October 27, 2005 || Mount Lemmon || Mount Lemmon Survey || V || align=right data-sort-value="0.72" | 720 m || 
|-id=399 bgcolor=#fefefe
| 227399 ||  || — || October 30, 2005 || Mount Lemmon || Mount Lemmon Survey || — || align=right data-sort-value="0.98" | 980 m || 
|-id=400 bgcolor=#fefefe
| 227400 ||  || — || October 30, 2005 || Mount Lemmon || Mount Lemmon Survey || — || align=right | 1.2 km || 
|}

227401–227500 

|-bgcolor=#fefefe
| 227401 ||  || — || October 29, 2005 || Mount Lemmon || Mount Lemmon Survey || NYS || align=right data-sort-value="0.99" | 990 m || 
|-id=402 bgcolor=#E9E9E9
| 227402 ||  || — || October 31, 2005 || Mount Lemmon || Mount Lemmon Survey || — || align=right | 1.5 km || 
|-id=403 bgcolor=#E9E9E9
| 227403 ||  || — || October 28, 2005 || Kitt Peak || Spacewatch || — || align=right | 1.1 km || 
|-id=404 bgcolor=#fefefe
| 227404 ||  || — || October 28, 2005 || Kitt Peak || Spacewatch || MAS || align=right data-sort-value="0.81" | 810 m || 
|-id=405 bgcolor=#E9E9E9
| 227405 ||  || — || October 29, 2005 || Mount Lemmon || Mount Lemmon Survey || RAF || align=right | 1.1 km || 
|-id=406 bgcolor=#E9E9E9
| 227406 ||  || — || October 31, 2005 || Kitt Peak || Spacewatch || RAF || align=right | 1.2 km || 
|-id=407 bgcolor=#fefefe
| 227407 ||  || — || October 29, 2005 || Catalina || CSS || — || align=right | 1.2 km || 
|-id=408 bgcolor=#fefefe
| 227408 ||  || — || October 30, 2005 || Kitt Peak || Spacewatch || — || align=right data-sort-value="0.98" | 980 m || 
|-id=409 bgcolor=#fefefe
| 227409 ||  || — || October 27, 2005 || Mount Lemmon || Mount Lemmon Survey || NYS || align=right data-sort-value="0.91" | 910 m || 
|-id=410 bgcolor=#fefefe
| 227410 ||  || — || October 31, 2005 || Palomar || NEAT || — || align=right | 2.2 km || 
|-id=411 bgcolor=#E9E9E9
| 227411 ||  || — || October 27, 2005 || Mount Lemmon || Mount Lemmon Survey || — || align=right | 1.7 km || 
|-id=412 bgcolor=#E9E9E9
| 227412 ||  || — || October 23, 2005 || Catalina || CSS || — || align=right | 1.5 km || 
|-id=413 bgcolor=#E9E9E9
| 227413 ||  || — || October 27, 2005 || Socorro || LINEAR || PAD || align=right | 2.2 km || 
|-id=414 bgcolor=#E9E9E9
| 227414 ||  || — || October 27, 2005 || Catalina || CSS || — || align=right | 2.5 km || 
|-id=415 bgcolor=#E9E9E9
| 227415 ||  || — || October 24, 2005 || Kitt Peak || Spacewatch || — || align=right | 1.5 km || 
|-id=416 bgcolor=#E9E9E9
| 227416 ||  || — || October 25, 2005 || Mount Lemmon || Mount Lemmon Survey || — || align=right | 2.7 km || 
|-id=417 bgcolor=#fefefe
| 227417 ||  || — || October 24, 2005 || Kitt Peak || Spacewatch || NYS || align=right data-sort-value="0.86" | 860 m || 
|-id=418 bgcolor=#E9E9E9
| 227418 ||  || — || October 25, 2005 || Apache Point || A. C. Becker || — || align=right | 2.9 km || 
|-id=419 bgcolor=#E9E9E9
| 227419 ||  || — || November 7, 2005 || Marly || Naef Obs. || — || align=right | 1.9 km || 
|-id=420 bgcolor=#E9E9E9
| 227420 ||  || — || November 3, 2005 || Kitt Peak || Spacewatch || AEO || align=right | 1.5 km || 
|-id=421 bgcolor=#E9E9E9
| 227421 ||  || — || November 4, 2005 || Kitt Peak || Spacewatch || EUN || align=right | 1.5 km || 
|-id=422 bgcolor=#fefefe
| 227422 ||  || — || November 3, 2005 || Catalina || CSS || V || align=right data-sort-value="0.92" | 920 m || 
|-id=423 bgcolor=#fefefe
| 227423 ||  || — || November 3, 2005 || Catalina || CSS || — || align=right | 2.1 km || 
|-id=424 bgcolor=#E9E9E9
| 227424 ||  || — || November 5, 2005 || Kitt Peak || Spacewatch || PAD || align=right | 2.1 km || 
|-id=425 bgcolor=#E9E9E9
| 227425 ||  || — || November 1, 2005 || Mount Lemmon || Mount Lemmon Survey || — || align=right | 2.0 km || 
|-id=426 bgcolor=#E9E9E9
| 227426 ||  || — || November 1, 2005 || Mount Lemmon || Mount Lemmon Survey || — || align=right | 1.8 km || 
|-id=427 bgcolor=#E9E9E9
| 227427 ||  || — || November 6, 2005 || Mount Lemmon || Mount Lemmon Survey || BRU || align=right | 5.2 km || 
|-id=428 bgcolor=#E9E9E9
| 227428 ||  || — || November 5, 2005 || Kitt Peak || Spacewatch || — || align=right | 1.2 km || 
|-id=429 bgcolor=#E9E9E9
| 227429 ||  || — || November 5, 2005 || Kitt Peak || Spacewatch || EUN || align=right | 2.0 km || 
|-id=430 bgcolor=#E9E9E9
| 227430 ||  || — || November 10, 2005 || Catalina || CSS || — || align=right | 2.8 km || 
|-id=431 bgcolor=#E9E9E9
| 227431 ||  || — || November 6, 2005 || Mount Lemmon || Mount Lemmon Survey || — || align=right data-sort-value="0.90" | 900 m || 
|-id=432 bgcolor=#fefefe
| 227432 ||  || — || November 11, 2005 || Kitt Peak || Spacewatch || V || align=right | 1.1 km || 
|-id=433 bgcolor=#E9E9E9
| 227433 ||  || — || November 1, 2005 || Palomar || NEAT || BRU || align=right | 3.5 km || 
|-id=434 bgcolor=#E9E9E9
| 227434 ||  || — || November 6, 2005 || Mount Lemmon || Mount Lemmon Survey || — || align=right | 1.8 km || 
|-id=435 bgcolor=#E9E9E9
| 227435 ||  || — || November 22, 2005 || Kitt Peak || Spacewatch || — || align=right | 2.4 km || 
|-id=436 bgcolor=#E9E9E9
| 227436 ||  || — || November 21, 2005 || Kitt Peak || Spacewatch || — || align=right | 1.1 km || 
|-id=437 bgcolor=#E9E9E9
| 227437 ||  || — || November 21, 2005 || Kitt Peak || Spacewatch || NEM || align=right | 2.9 km || 
|-id=438 bgcolor=#E9E9E9
| 227438 ||  || — || November 21, 2005 || Kitt Peak || Spacewatch || — || align=right | 1.8 km || 
|-id=439 bgcolor=#E9E9E9
| 227439 ||  || — || November 21, 2005 || Kitt Peak || Spacewatch || — || align=right | 1.0 km || 
|-id=440 bgcolor=#E9E9E9
| 227440 ||  || — || November 21, 2005 || Kitt Peak || Spacewatch || — || align=right | 1.1 km || 
|-id=441 bgcolor=#E9E9E9
| 227441 ||  || — || November 21, 2005 || Kitt Peak || Spacewatch || — || align=right | 1.3 km || 
|-id=442 bgcolor=#E9E9E9
| 227442 ||  || — || November 21, 2005 || Kitt Peak || Spacewatch || BRU || align=right | 4.6 km || 
|-id=443 bgcolor=#E9E9E9
| 227443 ||  || — || November 22, 2005 || Kitt Peak || Spacewatch || ADE || align=right | 3.2 km || 
|-id=444 bgcolor=#E9E9E9
| 227444 ||  || — || November 22, 2005 || Kitt Peak || Spacewatch || — || align=right | 1.2 km || 
|-id=445 bgcolor=#E9E9E9
| 227445 ||  || — || November 22, 2005 || Kitt Peak || Spacewatch || — || align=right | 1.8 km || 
|-id=446 bgcolor=#E9E9E9
| 227446 ||  || — || November 25, 2005 || Kitt Peak || Spacewatch || — || align=right | 1.7 km || 
|-id=447 bgcolor=#fefefe
| 227447 ||  || — || November 25, 2005 || Mount Lemmon || Mount Lemmon Survey || — || align=right | 1.0 km || 
|-id=448 bgcolor=#E9E9E9
| 227448 ||  || — || November 25, 2005 || Mount Lemmon || Mount Lemmon Survey || — || align=right | 1.5 km || 
|-id=449 bgcolor=#E9E9E9
| 227449 ||  || — || November 25, 2005 || Mount Lemmon || Mount Lemmon Survey || — || align=right | 2.2 km || 
|-id=450 bgcolor=#E9E9E9
| 227450 ||  || — || November 25, 2005 || Kitt Peak || Spacewatch || — || align=right | 1.9 km || 
|-id=451 bgcolor=#E9E9E9
| 227451 ||  || — || November 22, 2005 || Kitt Peak || Spacewatch || — || align=right | 1.9 km || 
|-id=452 bgcolor=#E9E9E9
| 227452 ||  || — || November 25, 2005 || Mount Lemmon || Mount Lemmon Survey || — || align=right | 1.6 km || 
|-id=453 bgcolor=#E9E9E9
| 227453 ||  || — || November 28, 2005 || Palomar || NEAT || — || align=right | 2.6 km || 
|-id=454 bgcolor=#E9E9E9
| 227454 ||  || — || November 28, 2005 || Mount Lemmon || Mount Lemmon Survey || AGN || align=right | 1.7 km || 
|-id=455 bgcolor=#E9E9E9
| 227455 ||  || — || November 28, 2005 || Mount Lemmon || Mount Lemmon Survey || — || align=right | 2.9 km || 
|-id=456 bgcolor=#E9E9E9
| 227456 ||  || — || November 28, 2005 || Mount Lemmon || Mount Lemmon Survey || — || align=right | 1.7 km || 
|-id=457 bgcolor=#E9E9E9
| 227457 ||  || — || November 29, 2005 || Kitt Peak || Spacewatch || AST || align=right | 1.8 km || 
|-id=458 bgcolor=#E9E9E9
| 227458 ||  || — || November 26, 2005 || Kitt Peak || Spacewatch || RAF || align=right | 1.6 km || 
|-id=459 bgcolor=#E9E9E9
| 227459 ||  || — || November 28, 2005 || Palomar || NEAT || EUN || align=right | 1.3 km || 
|-id=460 bgcolor=#E9E9E9
| 227460 ||  || — || November 28, 2005 || Catalina || CSS || — || align=right | 3.1 km || 
|-id=461 bgcolor=#E9E9E9
| 227461 ||  || — || November 25, 2005 || Catalina || CSS || — || align=right | 1.8 km || 
|-id=462 bgcolor=#E9E9E9
| 227462 ||  || — || November 30, 2005 || Socorro || LINEAR || — || align=right | 2.4 km || 
|-id=463 bgcolor=#E9E9E9
| 227463 ||  || — || November 30, 2005 || Socorro || LINEAR || EUN || align=right | 2.1 km || 
|-id=464 bgcolor=#E9E9E9
| 227464 ||  || — || November 29, 2005 || Mount Lemmon || Mount Lemmon Survey || — || align=right | 2.0 km || 
|-id=465 bgcolor=#E9E9E9
| 227465 ||  || — || November 29, 2005 || Mount Lemmon || Mount Lemmon Survey || GER || align=right | 2.3 km || 
|-id=466 bgcolor=#E9E9E9
| 227466 ||  || — || November 30, 2005 || Mount Lemmon || Mount Lemmon Survey || MIS || align=right | 2.5 km || 
|-id=467 bgcolor=#E9E9E9
| 227467 ||  || — || November 25, 2005 || Mount Lemmon || Mount Lemmon Survey || — || align=right | 2.6 km || 
|-id=468 bgcolor=#E9E9E9
| 227468 ||  || — || November 25, 2005 || Mount Lemmon || Mount Lemmon Survey || — || align=right | 4.2 km || 
|-id=469 bgcolor=#E9E9E9
| 227469 ||  || — || November 29, 2005 || Mount Lemmon || Mount Lemmon Survey || — || align=right | 1.4 km || 
|-id=470 bgcolor=#E9E9E9
| 227470 ||  || — || November 25, 2005 || Kitt Peak || Spacewatch || — || align=right | 1.3 km || 
|-id=471 bgcolor=#E9E9E9
| 227471 ||  || — || November 28, 2005 || Kitt Peak || Spacewatch || — || align=right | 2.6 km || 
|-id=472 bgcolor=#E9E9E9
| 227472 ||  || — || November 28, 2005 || Mount Lemmon || Mount Lemmon Survey || — || align=right | 2.1 km || 
|-id=473 bgcolor=#E9E9E9
| 227473 ||  || — || November 29, 2005 || Mount Lemmon || Mount Lemmon Survey || — || align=right | 2.3 km || 
|-id=474 bgcolor=#E9E9E9
| 227474 ||  || — || November 30, 2005 || Kitt Peak || Spacewatch || — || align=right | 1.9 km || 
|-id=475 bgcolor=#E9E9E9
| 227475 ||  || — || November 30, 2005 || Kitt Peak || Spacewatch || — || align=right | 2.4 km || 
|-id=476 bgcolor=#E9E9E9
| 227476 ||  || — || November 30, 2005 || Kitt Peak || Spacewatch || HEN || align=right | 1.4 km || 
|-id=477 bgcolor=#E9E9E9
| 227477 ||  || — || November 30, 2005 || Socorro || LINEAR || — || align=right | 2.7 km || 
|-id=478 bgcolor=#E9E9E9
| 227478 ||  || — || November 30, 2005 || Socorro || LINEAR || — || align=right | 1.3 km || 
|-id=479 bgcolor=#E9E9E9
| 227479 ||  || — || November 20, 2005 || Anderson Mesa || LONEOS || — || align=right | 1.6 km || 
|-id=480 bgcolor=#E9E9E9
| 227480 ||  || — || November 25, 2005 || Catalina || CSS || — || align=right | 4.5 km || 
|-id=481 bgcolor=#E9E9E9
| 227481 ||  || — || November 29, 2005 || Catalina || CSS || — || align=right | 2.4 km || 
|-id=482 bgcolor=#E9E9E9
| 227482 ||  || — || November 30, 2005 || Kitt Peak || Spacewatch || NEM || align=right | 2.8 km || 
|-id=483 bgcolor=#E9E9E9
| 227483 || 2005 XO || — || December 1, 2005 || Junk Bond || D. Healy || — || align=right | 1.1 km || 
|-id=484 bgcolor=#E9E9E9
| 227484 ||  || — || December 1, 2005 || Socorro || LINEAR || — || align=right | 1.4 km || 
|-id=485 bgcolor=#E9E9E9
| 227485 ||  || — || December 1, 2005 || Kitt Peak || Spacewatch || — || align=right | 1.8 km || 
|-id=486 bgcolor=#E9E9E9
| 227486 ||  || — || December 1, 2005 || Kitt Peak || Spacewatch || GER || align=right | 2.8 km || 
|-id=487 bgcolor=#fefefe
| 227487 ||  || — || December 2, 2005 || Kitt Peak || Spacewatch || NYS || align=right | 1.1 km || 
|-id=488 bgcolor=#E9E9E9
| 227488 ||  || — || December 4, 2005 || Socorro || LINEAR || — || align=right | 2.4 km || 
|-id=489 bgcolor=#E9E9E9
| 227489 ||  || — || December 1, 2005 || Palomar || NEAT || JUN || align=right | 1.8 km || 
|-id=490 bgcolor=#E9E9E9
| 227490 ||  || — || December 4, 2005 || Kitt Peak || Spacewatch || — || align=right | 2.2 km || 
|-id=491 bgcolor=#E9E9E9
| 227491 ||  || — || December 2, 2005 || Socorro || LINEAR || — || align=right | 1.4 km || 
|-id=492 bgcolor=#E9E9E9
| 227492 ||  || — || December 2, 2005 || Kitt Peak || Spacewatch || — || align=right | 2.8 km || 
|-id=493 bgcolor=#E9E9E9
| 227493 ||  || — || December 5, 2005 || Catalina || CSS || — || align=right | 3.9 km || 
|-id=494 bgcolor=#E9E9E9
| 227494 ||  || — || December 5, 2005 || Socorro || LINEAR || — || align=right | 1.00 km || 
|-id=495 bgcolor=#E9E9E9
| 227495 ||  || — || December 6, 2005 || Kitt Peak || Spacewatch || — || align=right | 1.6 km || 
|-id=496 bgcolor=#E9E9E9
| 227496 ||  || — || December 6, 2005 || Kitt Peak || Spacewatch || — || align=right | 3.7 km || 
|-id=497 bgcolor=#E9E9E9
| 227497 ||  || — || December 6, 2005 || Kitt Peak || Spacewatch || PAD || align=right | 2.4 km || 
|-id=498 bgcolor=#E9E9E9
| 227498 ||  || — || December 7, 2005 || Kitt Peak || Spacewatch || — || align=right | 2.8 km || 
|-id=499 bgcolor=#E9E9E9
| 227499 ||  || — || December 8, 2005 || Kitt Peak || Spacewatch || — || align=right | 2.5 km || 
|-id=500 bgcolor=#E9E9E9
| 227500 ||  || — || December 2, 2005 || Catalina || CSS || GER || align=right | 1.9 km || 
|}

227501–227600 

|-bgcolor=#E9E9E9
| 227501 ||  || — || December 1, 2005 || Kitt Peak || Spacewatch || — || align=right | 2.7 km || 
|-id=502 bgcolor=#E9E9E9
| 227502 ||  || — || December 4, 2005 || Socorro || LINEAR || — || align=right | 2.5 km || 
|-id=503 bgcolor=#E9E9E9
| 227503 ||  || — || December 10, 2005 || Catalina || CSS || — || align=right | 2.3 km || 
|-id=504 bgcolor=#d6d6d6
| 227504 ||  || — || December 1, 2005 || Kitt Peak || M. W. Buie || — || align=right | 3.5 km || 
|-id=505 bgcolor=#E9E9E9
| 227505 ||  || — || December 1, 2005 || Kitt Peak || M. W. Buie || HOF || align=right | 3.8 km || 
|-id=506 bgcolor=#d6d6d6
| 227506 ||  || — || December 1, 2005 || Kitt Peak || M. W. Buie || CHA || align=right | 3.1 km || 
|-id=507 bgcolor=#d6d6d6
| 227507 ||  || — || December 7, 2005 || Kitt Peak || Spacewatch || — || align=right | 6.8 km || 
|-id=508 bgcolor=#fefefe
| 227508 ||  || — || December 21, 2005 || Anderson Mesa || LONEOS || V || align=right | 1.1 km || 
|-id=509 bgcolor=#d6d6d6
| 227509 ||  || — || December 22, 2005 || Kitt Peak || Spacewatch || K-2 || align=right | 1.9 km || 
|-id=510 bgcolor=#E9E9E9
| 227510 ||  || — || December 21, 2005 || Kitt Peak || Spacewatch || — || align=right | 1.8 km || 
|-id=511 bgcolor=#d6d6d6
| 227511 ||  || — || December 22, 2005 || Kitt Peak || Spacewatch || — || align=right | 3.9 km || 
|-id=512 bgcolor=#d6d6d6
| 227512 ||  || — || December 24, 2005 || Kitt Peak || Spacewatch || KOR || align=right | 1.6 km || 
|-id=513 bgcolor=#E9E9E9
| 227513 ||  || — || December 22, 2005 || Catalina || CSS || JUN || align=right | 1.9 km || 
|-id=514 bgcolor=#d6d6d6
| 227514 ||  || — || December 22, 2005 || Kitt Peak || Spacewatch || KOR || align=right | 2.0 km || 
|-id=515 bgcolor=#d6d6d6
| 227515 ||  || — || December 24, 2005 || Kitt Peak || Spacewatch || 628 || align=right | 3.3 km || 
|-id=516 bgcolor=#E9E9E9
| 227516 ||  || — || December 24, 2005 || Kitt Peak || Spacewatch || — || align=right | 1.9 km || 
|-id=517 bgcolor=#E9E9E9
| 227517 ||  || — || December 25, 2005 || Kitt Peak || Spacewatch || MRX || align=right | 1.1 km || 
|-id=518 bgcolor=#d6d6d6
| 227518 ||  || — || December 22, 2005 || Kitt Peak || Spacewatch || — || align=right | 4.6 km || 
|-id=519 bgcolor=#E9E9E9
| 227519 ||  || — || December 22, 2005 || Kitt Peak || Spacewatch || — || align=right | 2.9 km || 
|-id=520 bgcolor=#d6d6d6
| 227520 ||  || — || December 21, 2005 || Kitt Peak || Spacewatch || KAR || align=right | 1.1 km || 
|-id=521 bgcolor=#E9E9E9
| 227521 ||  || — || December 22, 2005 || Kitt Peak || Spacewatch || — || align=right | 3.6 km || 
|-id=522 bgcolor=#E9E9E9
| 227522 ||  || — || December 25, 2005 || Kitt Peak || Spacewatch || — || align=right | 3.3 km || 
|-id=523 bgcolor=#E9E9E9
| 227523 ||  || — || December 25, 2005 || Mount Lemmon || Mount Lemmon Survey || — || align=right | 2.7 km || 
|-id=524 bgcolor=#E9E9E9
| 227524 ||  || — || December 21, 2005 || Catalina || CSS || — || align=right | 3.2 km || 
|-id=525 bgcolor=#d6d6d6
| 227525 ||  || — || December 24, 2005 || Kitt Peak || Spacewatch || KOR || align=right | 1.9 km || 
|-id=526 bgcolor=#d6d6d6
| 227526 ||  || — || December 26, 2005 || Kitt Peak || Spacewatch || — || align=right | 2.7 km || 
|-id=527 bgcolor=#E9E9E9
| 227527 ||  || — || December 22, 2005 || Kitt Peak || Spacewatch || — || align=right | 1.9 km || 
|-id=528 bgcolor=#d6d6d6
| 227528 ||  || — || December 22, 2005 || Kitt Peak || Spacewatch || — || align=right | 2.5 km || 
|-id=529 bgcolor=#E9E9E9
| 227529 ||  || — || December 24, 2005 || Kitt Peak || Spacewatch || — || align=right | 2.7 km || 
|-id=530 bgcolor=#E9E9E9
| 227530 ||  || — || December 26, 2005 || Kitt Peak || Spacewatch || — || align=right | 3.6 km || 
|-id=531 bgcolor=#E9E9E9
| 227531 ||  || — || December 24, 2005 || Kitt Peak || Spacewatch || — || align=right | 2.1 km || 
|-id=532 bgcolor=#E9E9E9
| 227532 ||  || — || December 24, 2005 || Kitt Peak || Spacewatch || — || align=right | 2.4 km || 
|-id=533 bgcolor=#E9E9E9
| 227533 ||  || — || December 24, 2005 || Kitt Peak || Spacewatch || MIS || align=right | 2.6 km || 
|-id=534 bgcolor=#d6d6d6
| 227534 ||  || — || December 24, 2005 || Kitt Peak || Spacewatch || — || align=right | 4.8 km || 
|-id=535 bgcolor=#E9E9E9
| 227535 ||  || — || December 26, 2005 || Mount Lemmon || Mount Lemmon Survey || — || align=right | 1.1 km || 
|-id=536 bgcolor=#d6d6d6
| 227536 ||  || — || December 26, 2005 || Mount Lemmon || Mount Lemmon Survey || — || align=right | 4.9 km || 
|-id=537 bgcolor=#E9E9E9
| 227537 ||  || — || December 26, 2005 || Mount Lemmon || Mount Lemmon Survey || — || align=right | 2.2 km || 
|-id=538 bgcolor=#E9E9E9
| 227538 ||  || — || December 27, 2005 || Catalina || CSS || — || align=right | 3.5 km || 
|-id=539 bgcolor=#d6d6d6
| 227539 ||  || — || December 25, 2005 || Kitt Peak || Spacewatch || KOR || align=right | 1.8 km || 
|-id=540 bgcolor=#d6d6d6
| 227540 ||  || — || December 25, 2005 || Kitt Peak || Spacewatch || — || align=right | 2.2 km || 
|-id=541 bgcolor=#E9E9E9
| 227541 ||  || — || December 25, 2005 || Kitt Peak || Spacewatch || MRX || align=right | 1.4 km || 
|-id=542 bgcolor=#d6d6d6
| 227542 ||  || — || December 25, 2005 || Kitt Peak || Spacewatch || — || align=right | 3.8 km || 
|-id=543 bgcolor=#E9E9E9
| 227543 ||  || — || December 27, 2005 || Mount Lemmon || Mount Lemmon Survey || AGN || align=right | 1.5 km || 
|-id=544 bgcolor=#E9E9E9
| 227544 ||  || — || December 26, 2005 || Kitt Peak || Spacewatch || — || align=right | 1.7 km || 
|-id=545 bgcolor=#E9E9E9
| 227545 ||  || — || December 25, 2005 || Gnosca || S. Sposetti || — || align=right | 3.4 km || 
|-id=546 bgcolor=#E9E9E9
| 227546 ||  || — || December 26, 2005 || Kitt Peak || Spacewatch || — || align=right | 1.9 km || 
|-id=547 bgcolor=#E9E9E9
| 227547 ||  || — || December 26, 2005 || Kitt Peak || Spacewatch || — || align=right | 2.8 km || 
|-id=548 bgcolor=#d6d6d6
| 227548 ||  || — || December 26, 2005 || Kitt Peak || Spacewatch || — || align=right | 2.6 km || 
|-id=549 bgcolor=#d6d6d6
| 227549 ||  || — || December 28, 2005 || Mount Lemmon || Mount Lemmon Survey || KOR || align=right | 1.8 km || 
|-id=550 bgcolor=#E9E9E9
| 227550 ||  || — || December 25, 2005 || Kitt Peak || Spacewatch || AGN || align=right | 2.1 km || 
|-id=551 bgcolor=#E9E9E9
| 227551 ||  || — || December 27, 2005 || Kitt Peak || Spacewatch || — || align=right | 1.6 km || 
|-id=552 bgcolor=#E9E9E9
| 227552 ||  || — || December 27, 2005 || Kitt Peak || Spacewatch || AGN || align=right | 1.2 km || 
|-id=553 bgcolor=#E9E9E9
| 227553 ||  || — || December 28, 2005 || Palomar || NEAT || — || align=right | 2.9 km || 
|-id=554 bgcolor=#E9E9E9
| 227554 ||  || — || December 31, 2005 || Kitt Peak || Spacewatch || PAD || align=right | 3.0 km || 
|-id=555 bgcolor=#E9E9E9
| 227555 ||  || — || December 29, 2005 || Catalina || CSS || MRX || align=right | 1.6 km || 
|-id=556 bgcolor=#d6d6d6
| 227556 ||  || — || December 22, 2005 || Kitt Peak || Spacewatch || KOR || align=right | 1.6 km || 
|-id=557 bgcolor=#E9E9E9
| 227557 ||  || — || December 25, 2005 || Kitt Peak || Spacewatch || — || align=right | 2.8 km || 
|-id=558 bgcolor=#E9E9E9
| 227558 ||  || — || December 30, 2005 || Socorro || LINEAR || — || align=right | 4.4 km || 
|-id=559 bgcolor=#E9E9E9
| 227559 ||  || — || December 27, 2005 || Mount Lemmon || Mount Lemmon Survey || — || align=right | 2.2 km || 
|-id=560 bgcolor=#E9E9E9
| 227560 ||  || — || December 27, 2005 || Kitt Peak || Spacewatch || — || align=right | 3.1 km || 
|-id=561 bgcolor=#d6d6d6
| 227561 ||  || — || December 30, 2005 || Socorro || LINEAR || — || align=right | 3.5 km || 
|-id=562 bgcolor=#E9E9E9
| 227562 ||  || — || December 30, 2005 || Kitt Peak || Spacewatch || HEN || align=right | 1.4 km || 
|-id=563 bgcolor=#E9E9E9
| 227563 ||  || — || December 30, 2005 || Kitt Peak || Spacewatch || AST || align=right | 3.1 km || 
|-id=564 bgcolor=#E9E9E9
| 227564 ||  || — || December 30, 2005 || Kitt Peak || Spacewatch || AST || align=right | 2.9 km || 
|-id=565 bgcolor=#d6d6d6
| 227565 ||  || — || December 30, 2005 || Kitt Peak || Spacewatch || KOR || align=right | 2.0 km || 
|-id=566 bgcolor=#E9E9E9
| 227566 ||  || — || December 25, 2005 || Mount Lemmon || Mount Lemmon Survey || — || align=right | 2.6 km || 
|-id=567 bgcolor=#E9E9E9
| 227567 ||  || — || December 22, 2005 || Kitt Peak || Spacewatch || — || align=right | 2.0 km || 
|-id=568 bgcolor=#E9E9E9
| 227568 ||  || — || December 26, 2005 || Mount Lemmon || Mount Lemmon Survey || — || align=right | 1.8 km || 
|-id=569 bgcolor=#E9E9E9
| 227569 ||  || — || December 27, 2005 || Kitt Peak || Spacewatch || — || align=right | 1.4 km || 
|-id=570 bgcolor=#E9E9E9
| 227570 ||  || — || December 24, 2005 || Socorro || LINEAR || — || align=right | 1.6 km || 
|-id=571 bgcolor=#E9E9E9
| 227571 ||  || — || December 30, 2005 || Catalina || CSS || — || align=right | 2.0 km || 
|-id=572 bgcolor=#E9E9E9
| 227572 ||  || — || December 31, 2005 || Kitt Peak || Spacewatch || — || align=right | 1.9 km || 
|-id=573 bgcolor=#E9E9E9
| 227573 ||  || — || December 21, 2005 || Kitt Peak || Spacewatch || — || align=right | 1.8 km || 
|-id=574 bgcolor=#E9E9E9
| 227574 ||  || — || December 24, 2005 || Kitt Peak || Spacewatch || — || align=right | 3.6 km || 
|-id=575 bgcolor=#E9E9E9
| 227575 ||  || — || December 26, 2005 || Kitt Peak || Spacewatch || — || align=right | 3.4 km || 
|-id=576 bgcolor=#E9E9E9
| 227576 ||  || — || December 28, 2005 || Kitt Peak || Spacewatch || AGN || align=right | 1.6 km || 
|-id=577 bgcolor=#E9E9E9
| 227577 ||  || — || December 29, 2005 || Kitt Peak || Spacewatch || AGN || align=right | 1.3 km || 
|-id=578 bgcolor=#E9E9E9
| 227578 ||  || — || December 29, 2005 || Kitt Peak || Spacewatch || — || align=right | 3.2 km || 
|-id=579 bgcolor=#E9E9E9
| 227579 ||  || — || December 24, 2005 || Kitt Peak || Spacewatch || — || align=right | 4.1 km || 
|-id=580 bgcolor=#E9E9E9
| 227580 ||  || — || December 30, 2005 || Kitt Peak || Spacewatch || — || align=right | 2.4 km || 
|-id=581 bgcolor=#E9E9E9
| 227581 ||  || — || December 28, 2005 || Mount Lemmon || Mount Lemmon Survey || — || align=right | 1.9 km || 
|-id=582 bgcolor=#E9E9E9
| 227582 ||  || — || December 25, 2005 || Mount Lemmon || Mount Lemmon Survey || — || align=right | 2.4 km || 
|-id=583 bgcolor=#E9E9E9
| 227583 ||  || — || January 5, 2006 || Vicques || M. Ory || — || align=right | 2.4 km || 
|-id=584 bgcolor=#E9E9E9
| 227584 ||  || — || January 7, 2006 || Mayhill || A. Lowe || — || align=right | 3.1 km || 
|-id=585 bgcolor=#E9E9E9
| 227585 ||  || — || January 2, 2006 || Catalina || CSS || JUN || align=right | 1.4 km || 
|-id=586 bgcolor=#E9E9E9
| 227586 ||  || — || January 2, 2006 || Catalina || CSS || EUN || align=right | 2.0 km || 
|-id=587 bgcolor=#d6d6d6
| 227587 ||  || — || January 5, 2006 || Mount Lemmon || Mount Lemmon Survey || SAN || align=right | 4.6 km || 
|-id=588 bgcolor=#E9E9E9
| 227588 ||  || — || January 5, 2006 || Mount Lemmon || Mount Lemmon Survey || — || align=right | 4.3 km || 
|-id=589 bgcolor=#E9E9E9
| 227589 ||  || — || January 5, 2006 || Catalina || CSS || — || align=right | 1.9 km || 
|-id=590 bgcolor=#d6d6d6
| 227590 ||  || — || January 4, 2006 || Kitt Peak || Spacewatch || KOR || align=right | 2.0 km || 
|-id=591 bgcolor=#d6d6d6
| 227591 ||  || — || January 4, 2006 || Kitt Peak || Spacewatch || KOR || align=right | 2.1 km || 
|-id=592 bgcolor=#d6d6d6
| 227592 ||  || — || January 5, 2006 || Kitt Peak || Spacewatch || — || align=right | 3.1 km || 
|-id=593 bgcolor=#E9E9E9
| 227593 ||  || — || January 6, 2006 || Kitt Peak || Spacewatch || GEF || align=right | 1.8 km || 
|-id=594 bgcolor=#E9E9E9
| 227594 ||  || — || January 5, 2006 || Catalina || CSS || — || align=right | 3.6 km || 
|-id=595 bgcolor=#E9E9E9
| 227595 ||  || — || January 4, 2006 || Kitt Peak || Spacewatch || — || align=right | 4.2 km || 
|-id=596 bgcolor=#E9E9E9
| 227596 ||  || — || January 5, 2006 || Kitt Peak || Spacewatch || AGN || align=right | 1.4 km || 
|-id=597 bgcolor=#d6d6d6
| 227597 ||  || — || January 6, 2006 || Kitt Peak || Spacewatch || — || align=right | 3.5 km || 
|-id=598 bgcolor=#E9E9E9
| 227598 ||  || — || January 6, 2006 || Kitt Peak || Spacewatch || AGN || align=right | 1.5 km || 
|-id=599 bgcolor=#d6d6d6
| 227599 ||  || — || January 4, 2006 || Mount Lemmon || Mount Lemmon Survey || KOR || align=right | 1.5 km || 
|-id=600 bgcolor=#d6d6d6
| 227600 ||  || — || January 5, 2006 || Kitt Peak || Spacewatch || — || align=right | 2.9 km || 
|}

227601–227700 

|-bgcolor=#E9E9E9
| 227601 ||  || — || January 5, 2006 || Kitt Peak || Spacewatch || HOF || align=right | 2.9 km || 
|-id=602 bgcolor=#d6d6d6
| 227602 ||  || — || January 5, 2006 || Mount Lemmon || Mount Lemmon Survey || KOR || align=right | 1.8 km || 
|-id=603 bgcolor=#E9E9E9
| 227603 ||  || — || January 5, 2006 || Mount Lemmon || Mount Lemmon Survey || — || align=right | 2.6 km || 
|-id=604 bgcolor=#d6d6d6
| 227604 ||  || — || January 5, 2006 || Mount Lemmon || Mount Lemmon Survey || — || align=right | 3.8 km || 
|-id=605 bgcolor=#E9E9E9
| 227605 ||  || — || January 6, 2006 || Kitt Peak || Spacewatch || HOF || align=right | 3.9 km || 
|-id=606 bgcolor=#E9E9E9
| 227606 ||  || — || January 6, 2006 || Kitt Peak || Spacewatch || — || align=right | 2.5 km || 
|-id=607 bgcolor=#E9E9E9
| 227607 ||  || — || January 6, 2006 || Mount Lemmon || Mount Lemmon Survey || — || align=right | 2.7 km || 
|-id=608 bgcolor=#E9E9E9
| 227608 ||  || — || January 6, 2006 || Kitt Peak || Spacewatch || — || align=right | 2.5 km || 
|-id=609 bgcolor=#d6d6d6
| 227609 ||  || — || January 9, 2006 || Kitt Peak || Spacewatch || — || align=right | 2.8 km || 
|-id=610 bgcolor=#d6d6d6
| 227610 ||  || — || January 6, 2006 || Anderson Mesa || LONEOS || — || align=right | 2.9 km || 
|-id=611 bgcolor=#d6d6d6
| 227611 ||  || — || January 9, 2006 || Kitt Peak || Spacewatch || KOR || align=right | 1.6 km || 
|-id=612 bgcolor=#E9E9E9
| 227612 ||  || — || January 7, 2006 || Anderson Mesa || LONEOS || — || align=right | 4.1 km || 
|-id=613 bgcolor=#d6d6d6
| 227613 ||  || — || January 4, 2006 || Mount Lemmon || Mount Lemmon Survey || — || align=right | 2.7 km || 
|-id=614 bgcolor=#E9E9E9
| 227614 ||  || — || January 20, 2006 || Kitt Peak || Spacewatch || — || align=right | 3.3 km || 
|-id=615 bgcolor=#E9E9E9
| 227615 ||  || — || January 21, 2006 || Kitt Peak || Spacewatch || MIS || align=right | 1.6 km || 
|-id=616 bgcolor=#d6d6d6
| 227616 ||  || — || January 20, 2006 || Kitt Peak || Spacewatch || — || align=right | 2.8 km || 
|-id=617 bgcolor=#d6d6d6
| 227617 ||  || — || January 20, 2006 || Kitt Peak || Spacewatch || — || align=right | 3.5 km || 
|-id=618 bgcolor=#d6d6d6
| 227618 ||  || — || January 22, 2006 || Mount Lemmon || Mount Lemmon Survey || — || align=right | 2.7 km || 
|-id=619 bgcolor=#E9E9E9
| 227619 ||  || — || January 22, 2006 || Anderson Mesa || LONEOS || — || align=right | 2.4 km || 
|-id=620 bgcolor=#d6d6d6
| 227620 ||  || — || January 21, 2006 || Kitt Peak || Spacewatch || KOR || align=right | 2.2 km || 
|-id=621 bgcolor=#E9E9E9
| 227621 ||  || — || January 23, 2006 || Socorro || LINEAR || — || align=right | 2.8 km || 
|-id=622 bgcolor=#d6d6d6
| 227622 ||  || — || January 23, 2006 || Mount Lemmon || Mount Lemmon Survey || — || align=right | 2.8 km || 
|-id=623 bgcolor=#d6d6d6
| 227623 ||  || — || January 25, 2006 || Kitt Peak || Spacewatch || KOR || align=right | 1.4 km || 
|-id=624 bgcolor=#d6d6d6
| 227624 ||  || — || January 25, 2006 || Kitt Peak || Spacewatch || — || align=right | 3.6 km || 
|-id=625 bgcolor=#d6d6d6
| 227625 ||  || — || January 26, 2006 || Kitt Peak || Spacewatch || — || align=right | 2.6 km || 
|-id=626 bgcolor=#E9E9E9
| 227626 ||  || — || January 22, 2006 || Catalina || CSS || MIT || align=right | 3.3 km || 
|-id=627 bgcolor=#E9E9E9
| 227627 ||  || — || January 23, 2006 || Kitt Peak || Spacewatch || HEN || align=right | 1.7 km || 
|-id=628 bgcolor=#E9E9E9
| 227628 ||  || — || January 23, 2006 || Kitt Peak || Spacewatch || — || align=right | 2.9 km || 
|-id=629 bgcolor=#d6d6d6
| 227629 ||  || — || January 23, 2006 || Mount Lemmon || Mount Lemmon Survey || KOR || align=right | 1.9 km || 
|-id=630 bgcolor=#d6d6d6
| 227630 ||  || — || January 25, 2006 || Kitt Peak || Spacewatch || — || align=right | 3.9 km || 
|-id=631 bgcolor=#d6d6d6
| 227631 ||  || — || January 25, 2006 || Kitt Peak || Spacewatch || KOR || align=right | 1.8 km || 
|-id=632 bgcolor=#d6d6d6
| 227632 ||  || — || January 25, 2006 || Kitt Peak || Spacewatch || THM || align=right | 5.1 km || 
|-id=633 bgcolor=#E9E9E9
| 227633 ||  || — || January 26, 2006 || Kitt Peak || Spacewatch || MRX || align=right | 1.5 km || 
|-id=634 bgcolor=#d6d6d6
| 227634 ||  || — || January 26, 2006 || Kitt Peak || Spacewatch || — || align=right | 3.8 km || 
|-id=635 bgcolor=#d6d6d6
| 227635 ||  || — || January 26, 2006 || Kitt Peak || Spacewatch || — || align=right | 3.8 km || 
|-id=636 bgcolor=#d6d6d6
| 227636 ||  || — || January 26, 2006 || Mount Lemmon || Mount Lemmon Survey || THM || align=right | 3.5 km || 
|-id=637 bgcolor=#d6d6d6
| 227637 ||  || — || January 26, 2006 || Kitt Peak || Spacewatch || — || align=right | 3.9 km || 
|-id=638 bgcolor=#E9E9E9
| 227638 ||  || — || January 26, 2006 || Kitt Peak || Spacewatch || — || align=right | 3.5 km || 
|-id=639 bgcolor=#d6d6d6
| 227639 ||  || — || January 26, 2006 || Kitt Peak || Spacewatch || — || align=right | 3.6 km || 
|-id=640 bgcolor=#E9E9E9
| 227640 ||  || — || January 20, 2006 || Catalina || CSS || — || align=right | 3.1 km || 
|-id=641 bgcolor=#d6d6d6
| 227641 Nothomb ||  ||  || January 28, 2006 || Nogales || J.-C. Merlin || KOR || align=right | 1.7 km || 
|-id=642 bgcolor=#d6d6d6
| 227642 ||  || — || January 23, 2006 || Mount Lemmon || Mount Lemmon Survey || — || align=right | 4.8 km || 
|-id=643 bgcolor=#E9E9E9
| 227643 ||  || — || January 25, 2006 || Kitt Peak || Spacewatch || — || align=right | 3.0 km || 
|-id=644 bgcolor=#d6d6d6
| 227644 ||  || — || January 25, 2006 || Kitt Peak || Spacewatch || — || align=right | 3.0 km || 
|-id=645 bgcolor=#d6d6d6
| 227645 ||  || — || January 25, 2006 || Kitt Peak || Spacewatch || KOR || align=right | 2.2 km || 
|-id=646 bgcolor=#d6d6d6
| 227646 ||  || — || January 26, 2006 || Kitt Peak || Spacewatch || — || align=right | 2.9 km || 
|-id=647 bgcolor=#d6d6d6
| 227647 ||  || — || January 26, 2006 || Kitt Peak || Spacewatch || — || align=right | 3.6 km || 
|-id=648 bgcolor=#d6d6d6
| 227648 ||  || — || January 26, 2006 || Mount Lemmon || Mount Lemmon Survey || — || align=right | 3.6 km || 
|-id=649 bgcolor=#d6d6d6
| 227649 ||  || — || January 26, 2006 || Kitt Peak || Spacewatch || — || align=right | 5.1 km || 
|-id=650 bgcolor=#d6d6d6
| 227650 ||  || — || January 27, 2006 || Mount Lemmon || Mount Lemmon Survey || THM || align=right | 5.6 km || 
|-id=651 bgcolor=#d6d6d6
| 227651 ||  || — || January 25, 2006 || Kitt Peak || Spacewatch || 628 || align=right | 3.0 km || 
|-id=652 bgcolor=#d6d6d6
| 227652 ||  || — || January 26, 2006 || Kitt Peak || Spacewatch || — || align=right | 4.4 km || 
|-id=653 bgcolor=#d6d6d6
| 227653 ||  || — || January 29, 2006 || Junk Bond || D. Healy || KOR || align=right | 1.7 km || 
|-id=654 bgcolor=#d6d6d6
| 227654 ||  || — || January 24, 2006 || Anderson Mesa || LONEOS || EOS || align=right | 3.1 km || 
|-id=655 bgcolor=#d6d6d6
| 227655 ||  || — || January 25, 2006 || Kitt Peak || Spacewatch || KAR || align=right | 1.5 km || 
|-id=656 bgcolor=#d6d6d6
| 227656 ||  || — || January 25, 2006 || Kitt Peak || Spacewatch || — || align=right | 5.6 km || 
|-id=657 bgcolor=#d6d6d6
| 227657 ||  || — || January 25, 2006 || Kitt Peak || Spacewatch || — || align=right | 3.4 km || 
|-id=658 bgcolor=#d6d6d6
| 227658 ||  || — || January 27, 2006 || Kitt Peak || Spacewatch || KAR || align=right | 1.5 km || 
|-id=659 bgcolor=#d6d6d6
| 227659 ||  || — || January 27, 2006 || Kitt Peak || Spacewatch || — || align=right | 2.7 km || 
|-id=660 bgcolor=#d6d6d6
| 227660 ||  || — || January 27, 2006 || Kitt Peak || Spacewatch || HYG || align=right | 4.7 km || 
|-id=661 bgcolor=#d6d6d6
| 227661 ||  || — || January 30, 2006 || Kitt Peak || Spacewatch || EOS || align=right | 2.9 km || 
|-id=662 bgcolor=#d6d6d6
| 227662 ||  || — || January 30, 2006 || Kitt Peak || Spacewatch || THM || align=right | 3.1 km || 
|-id=663 bgcolor=#E9E9E9
| 227663 ||  || — || January 31, 2006 || Mount Lemmon || Mount Lemmon Survey || — || align=right | 1.9 km || 
|-id=664 bgcolor=#d6d6d6
| 227664 ||  || — || January 31, 2006 || Kitt Peak || Spacewatch || KOR || align=right | 2.0 km || 
|-id=665 bgcolor=#d6d6d6
| 227665 ||  || — || January 31, 2006 || Kitt Peak || Spacewatch || — || align=right | 3.0 km || 
|-id=666 bgcolor=#d6d6d6
| 227666 ||  || — || January 31, 2006 || Catalina || CSS || — || align=right | 5.7 km || 
|-id=667 bgcolor=#d6d6d6
| 227667 ||  || — || January 31, 2006 || Catalina || CSS || EOS || align=right | 2.8 km || 
|-id=668 bgcolor=#d6d6d6
| 227668 ||  || — || January 30, 2006 || Kitt Peak || Spacewatch || — || align=right | 3.4 km || 
|-id=669 bgcolor=#d6d6d6
| 227669 ||  || — || January 31, 2006 || Kitt Peak || Spacewatch || — || align=right | 3.3 km || 
|-id=670 bgcolor=#E9E9E9
| 227670 ||  || — || January 31, 2006 || Mount Lemmon || Mount Lemmon Survey || HOF || align=right | 3.6 km || 
|-id=671 bgcolor=#d6d6d6
| 227671 ||  || — || January 31, 2006 || Kitt Peak || Spacewatch || — || align=right | 3.4 km || 
|-id=672 bgcolor=#d6d6d6
| 227672 ||  || — || January 31, 2006 || Kitt Peak || Spacewatch || — || align=right | 3.8 km || 
|-id=673 bgcolor=#d6d6d6
| 227673 ||  || — || February 1, 2006 || Kitt Peak || Spacewatch || — || align=right | 2.6 km || 
|-id=674 bgcolor=#d6d6d6
| 227674 ||  || — || February 1, 2006 || Kitt Peak || Spacewatch || — || align=right | 3.6 km || 
|-id=675 bgcolor=#d6d6d6
| 227675 ||  || — || February 1, 2006 || Mount Lemmon || Mount Lemmon Survey || — || align=right | 4.4 km || 
|-id=676 bgcolor=#E9E9E9
| 227676 ||  || — || February 1, 2006 || Kitt Peak || Spacewatch || — || align=right | 3.4 km || 
|-id=677 bgcolor=#E9E9E9
| 227677 ||  || — || February 1, 2006 || Mount Lemmon || Mount Lemmon Survey || — || align=right | 3.4 km || 
|-id=678 bgcolor=#d6d6d6
| 227678 ||  || — || February 1, 2006 || Mount Lemmon || Mount Lemmon Survey || — || align=right | 4.0 km || 
|-id=679 bgcolor=#E9E9E9
| 227679 ||  || — || February 2, 2006 || Catalina || CSS || GEF || align=right | 1.7 km || 
|-id=680 bgcolor=#E9E9E9
| 227680 ||  || — || February 2, 2006 || Catalina || CSS || HOF || align=right | 4.7 km || 
|-id=681 bgcolor=#d6d6d6
| 227681 ||  || — || February 2, 2006 || Kitt Peak || Spacewatch || — || align=right | 3.9 km || 
|-id=682 bgcolor=#E9E9E9
| 227682 ||  || — || February 3, 2006 || Mount Lemmon || Mount Lemmon Survey || — || align=right | 2.5 km || 
|-id=683 bgcolor=#E9E9E9
| 227683 ||  || — || February 3, 2006 || Socorro || LINEAR || — || align=right | 3.6 km || 
|-id=684 bgcolor=#d6d6d6
| 227684 ||  || — || February 9, 2006 || Palomar || NEAT || — || align=right | 5.0 km || 
|-id=685 bgcolor=#d6d6d6
| 227685 ||  || — || February 9, 2006 || Palomar || NEAT || — || align=right | 3.0 km || 
|-id=686 bgcolor=#d6d6d6
| 227686 ||  || — || February 20, 2006 || Kitt Peak || Spacewatch || THM || align=right | 3.6 km || 
|-id=687 bgcolor=#d6d6d6
| 227687 ||  || — || February 20, 2006 || Catalina || CSS || — || align=right | 4.8 km || 
|-id=688 bgcolor=#d6d6d6
| 227688 ||  || — || February 20, 2006 || Kitt Peak || Spacewatch || EOS || align=right | 2.4 km || 
|-id=689 bgcolor=#d6d6d6
| 227689 ||  || — || February 20, 2006 || Kitt Peak || Spacewatch || KOR || align=right | 1.4 km || 
|-id=690 bgcolor=#d6d6d6
| 227690 ||  || — || February 20, 2006 || Kitt Peak || Spacewatch || — || align=right | 3.0 km || 
|-id=691 bgcolor=#d6d6d6
| 227691 ||  || — || February 20, 2006 || Kitt Peak || Spacewatch || — || align=right | 3.5 km || 
|-id=692 bgcolor=#d6d6d6
| 227692 ||  || — || February 20, 2006 || Kitt Peak || Spacewatch || — || align=right | 6.0 km || 
|-id=693 bgcolor=#E9E9E9
| 227693 ||  || — || February 20, 2006 || Kitt Peak || Spacewatch || — || align=right | 1.7 km || 
|-id=694 bgcolor=#d6d6d6
| 227694 ||  || — || February 21, 2006 || Mount Lemmon || Mount Lemmon Survey || — || align=right | 3.8 km || 
|-id=695 bgcolor=#d6d6d6
| 227695 ||  || — || February 20, 2006 || Catalina || CSS || — || align=right | 5.5 km || 
|-id=696 bgcolor=#d6d6d6
| 227696 ||  || — || February 21, 2006 || Mount Lemmon || Mount Lemmon Survey || — || align=right | 2.8 km || 
|-id=697 bgcolor=#d6d6d6
| 227697 ||  || — || February 24, 2006 || Catalina || CSS || — || align=right | 6.7 km || 
|-id=698 bgcolor=#d6d6d6
| 227698 ||  || — || February 24, 2006 || Kitt Peak || Spacewatch || — || align=right | 3.6 km || 
|-id=699 bgcolor=#d6d6d6
| 227699 ||  || — || February 24, 2006 || Catalina || CSS || — || align=right | 6.7 km || 
|-id=700 bgcolor=#E9E9E9
| 227700 ||  || — || February 21, 2006 || Anderson Mesa || LONEOS || RAF || align=right | 1.4 km || 
|}

227701–227800 

|-bgcolor=#E9E9E9
| 227701 ||  || — || February 23, 2006 || Anderson Mesa || LONEOS || HEN || align=right | 1.9 km || 
|-id=702 bgcolor=#d6d6d6
| 227702 ||  || — || February 24, 2006 || Kitt Peak || Spacewatch || — || align=right | 4.3 km || 
|-id=703 bgcolor=#d6d6d6
| 227703 ||  || — || February 24, 2006 || Kitt Peak || Spacewatch || — || align=right | 3.1 km || 
|-id=704 bgcolor=#d6d6d6
| 227704 ||  || — || February 24, 2006 || Kitt Peak || Spacewatch || — || align=right | 3.5 km || 
|-id=705 bgcolor=#E9E9E9
| 227705 ||  || — || February 24, 2006 || Kitt Peak || Spacewatch || — || align=right | 2.8 km || 
|-id=706 bgcolor=#d6d6d6
| 227706 ||  || — || February 24, 2006 || Kitt Peak || Spacewatch || — || align=right | 3.1 km || 
|-id=707 bgcolor=#d6d6d6
| 227707 ||  || — || February 25, 2006 || Kitt Peak || Spacewatch || — || align=right | 3.4 km || 
|-id=708 bgcolor=#d6d6d6
| 227708 ||  || — || February 25, 2006 || Mount Lemmon || Mount Lemmon Survey || KAR || align=right | 2.1 km || 
|-id=709 bgcolor=#d6d6d6
| 227709 ||  || — || February 25, 2006 || Mount Lemmon || Mount Lemmon Survey || — || align=right | 3.7 km || 
|-id=710 bgcolor=#d6d6d6
| 227710 ||  || — || February 26, 2006 || Anderson Mesa || LONEOS || — || align=right | 5.2 km || 
|-id=711 bgcolor=#d6d6d6
| 227711 ||  || — || February 27, 2006 || Catalina || CSS || — || align=right | 7.5 km || 
|-id=712 bgcolor=#d6d6d6
| 227712 ||  || — || February 27, 2006 || Kitt Peak || Spacewatch || — || align=right | 3.6 km || 
|-id=713 bgcolor=#d6d6d6
| 227713 ||  || — || February 25, 2006 || Kitt Peak || Spacewatch || — || align=right | 4.8 km || 
|-id=714 bgcolor=#d6d6d6
| 227714 ||  || — || February 25, 2006 || Kitt Peak || Spacewatch || — || align=right | 3.6 km || 
|-id=715 bgcolor=#d6d6d6
| 227715 ||  || — || February 27, 2006 || Kitt Peak || Spacewatch || — || align=right | 3.5 km || 
|-id=716 bgcolor=#d6d6d6
| 227716 ||  || — || February 27, 2006 || Kitt Peak || Spacewatch || — || align=right | 3.4 km || 
|-id=717 bgcolor=#d6d6d6
| 227717 ||  || — || February 27, 2006 || Kitt Peak || Spacewatch || — || align=right | 3.0 km || 
|-id=718 bgcolor=#E9E9E9
| 227718 ||  || — || February 24, 2006 || Catalina || CSS || — || align=right | 2.0 km || 
|-id=719 bgcolor=#d6d6d6
| 227719 ||  || — || February 24, 2006 || Palomar || NEAT || SAN || align=right | 2.3 km || 
|-id=720 bgcolor=#d6d6d6
| 227720 ||  || — || February 25, 2006 || Kitt Peak || Spacewatch || — || align=right | 4.0 km || 
|-id=721 bgcolor=#d6d6d6
| 227721 ||  || — || February 25, 2006 || Mount Lemmon || Mount Lemmon Survey || — || align=right | 5.4 km || 
|-id=722 bgcolor=#d6d6d6
| 227722 || 2006 EQ || — || March 4, 2006 || Great Shefford || Great Shefford Obs. || — || align=right | 5.1 km || 
|-id=723 bgcolor=#d6d6d6
| 227723 ||  || — || March 2, 2006 || Kitt Peak || Spacewatch || — || align=right | 3.2 km || 
|-id=724 bgcolor=#d6d6d6
| 227724 ||  || — || March 3, 2006 || Kitt Peak || Spacewatch || — || align=right | 2.9 km || 
|-id=725 bgcolor=#d6d6d6
| 227725 ||  || — || March 3, 2006 || Kitt Peak || Spacewatch || — || align=right | 2.8 km || 
|-id=726 bgcolor=#d6d6d6
| 227726 ||  || — || March 3, 2006 || Kitt Peak || Spacewatch || — || align=right | 2.5 km || 
|-id=727 bgcolor=#E9E9E9
| 227727 ||  || — || March 3, 2006 || Kitt Peak || Spacewatch || — || align=right | 3.2 km || 
|-id=728 bgcolor=#d6d6d6
| 227728 ||  || — || March 4, 2006 || Catalina || CSS || — || align=right | 6.8 km || 
|-id=729 bgcolor=#d6d6d6
| 227729 ||  || — || March 5, 2006 || Kitt Peak || Spacewatch || — || align=right | 4.1 km || 
|-id=730 bgcolor=#d6d6d6
| 227730 ||  || — || March 5, 2006 || Kitt Peak || Spacewatch || — || align=right | 3.2 km || 
|-id=731 bgcolor=#d6d6d6
| 227731 ||  || — || March 5, 2006 || Kitt Peak || Spacewatch || — || align=right | 5.0 km || 
|-id=732 bgcolor=#d6d6d6
| 227732 ||  || — || March 23, 2006 || Mount Lemmon || Mount Lemmon Survey || — || align=right | 4.0 km || 
|-id=733 bgcolor=#d6d6d6
| 227733 ||  || — || March 23, 2006 || Kitt Peak || Spacewatch || HYG || align=right | 4.1 km || 
|-id=734 bgcolor=#d6d6d6
| 227734 ||  || — || March 23, 2006 || Kitt Peak || Spacewatch || — || align=right | 3.2 km || 
|-id=735 bgcolor=#d6d6d6
| 227735 ||  || — || March 23, 2006 || Mount Lemmon || Mount Lemmon Survey || — || align=right | 3.7 km || 
|-id=736 bgcolor=#d6d6d6
| 227736 ||  || — || March 23, 2006 || Mount Lemmon || Mount Lemmon Survey || THM || align=right | 2.5 km || 
|-id=737 bgcolor=#d6d6d6
| 227737 ||  || — || March 24, 2006 || Kitt Peak || Spacewatch || EOS || align=right | 2.3 km || 
|-id=738 bgcolor=#d6d6d6
| 227738 ||  || — || March 24, 2006 || Mount Lemmon || Mount Lemmon Survey || THM || align=right | 3.0 km || 
|-id=739 bgcolor=#d6d6d6
| 227739 ||  || — || March 25, 2006 || Mount Lemmon || Mount Lemmon Survey || — || align=right | 3.3 km || 
|-id=740 bgcolor=#d6d6d6
| 227740 ||  || — || March 24, 2006 || Socorro || LINEAR || THM || align=right | 3.5 km || 
|-id=741 bgcolor=#d6d6d6
| 227741 ||  || — || April 2, 2006 || Kitt Peak || Spacewatch || THM || align=right | 3.5 km || 
|-id=742 bgcolor=#d6d6d6
| 227742 ||  || — || April 7, 2006 || Catalina || CSS || LIX || align=right | 6.6 km || 
|-id=743 bgcolor=#d6d6d6
| 227743 ||  || — || April 19, 2006 || Mount Lemmon || Mount Lemmon Survey || — || align=right | 4.1 km || 
|-id=744 bgcolor=#d6d6d6
| 227744 ||  || — || April 20, 2006 || Kitt Peak || Spacewatch || — || align=right | 3.9 km || 
|-id=745 bgcolor=#d6d6d6
| 227745 ||  || — || April 20, 2006 || Kitt Peak || Spacewatch || — || align=right | 4.1 km || 
|-id=746 bgcolor=#d6d6d6
| 227746 ||  || — || April 20, 2006 || Catalina || CSS || — || align=right | 5.3 km || 
|-id=747 bgcolor=#d6d6d6
| 227747 ||  || — || April 21, 2006 || Catalina || CSS || — || align=right | 4.7 km || 
|-id=748 bgcolor=#d6d6d6
| 227748 ||  || — || April 20, 2006 || Catalina || CSS || — || align=right | 4.1 km || 
|-id=749 bgcolor=#d6d6d6
| 227749 ||  || — || April 21, 2006 || Ottmarsheim || C. Rinner || — || align=right | 3.6 km || 
|-id=750 bgcolor=#d6d6d6
| 227750 ||  || — || April 21, 2006 || Catalina || CSS || — || align=right | 4.0 km || 
|-id=751 bgcolor=#d6d6d6
| 227751 ||  || — || April 24, 2006 || Kitt Peak || Spacewatch || THM || align=right | 3.1 km || 
|-id=752 bgcolor=#d6d6d6
| 227752 ||  || — || April 30, 2006 || Kitt Peak || Spacewatch || — || align=right | 2.8 km || 
|-id=753 bgcolor=#d6d6d6
| 227753 ||  || — || April 30, 2006 || Kitt Peak || Spacewatch || — || align=right | 3.1 km || 
|-id=754 bgcolor=#d6d6d6
| 227754 ||  || — || April 30, 2006 || Catalina || CSS || EOS || align=right | 3.0 km || 
|-id=755 bgcolor=#d6d6d6
| 227755 ||  || — || May 1, 2006 || Kitt Peak || Spacewatch || SHU3:2 || align=right | 7.0 km || 
|-id=756 bgcolor=#d6d6d6
| 227756 ||  || — || May 5, 2006 || Kitt Peak || Spacewatch || — || align=right | 5.0 km || 
|-id=757 bgcolor=#d6d6d6
| 227757 ||  || — || May 20, 2006 || Anderson Mesa || LONEOS || — || align=right | 7.0 km || 
|-id=758 bgcolor=#d6d6d6
| 227758 ||  || — || May 21, 2006 || Catalina || CSS || — || align=right | 5.9 km || 
|-id=759 bgcolor=#C2FFFF
| 227759 ||  || — || June 20, 2006 || Kitt Peak || Spacewatch || L4 || align=right | 10 km || 
|-id=760 bgcolor=#FA8072
| 227760 ||  || — || June 28, 2006 || Siding Spring || SSS || H || align=right | 1.4 km || 
|-id=761 bgcolor=#fefefe
| 227761 ||  || — || August 18, 2006 || Socorro || LINEAR || H || align=right | 1.2 km || 
|-id=762 bgcolor=#fefefe
| 227762 ||  || — || August 31, 2006 || Siding Spring || SSS || H || align=right data-sort-value="0.85" | 850 m || 
|-id=763 bgcolor=#fefefe
| 227763 ||  || — || September 14, 2006 || Catalina || CSS || H || align=right data-sort-value="0.64" | 640 m || 
|-id=764 bgcolor=#FA8072
| 227764 ||  || — || September 17, 2006 || Catalina || CSS || — || align=right data-sort-value="0.96" | 960 m || 
|-id=765 bgcolor=#fefefe
| 227765 ||  || — || September 28, 2006 || Mount Lemmon || Mount Lemmon Survey || — || align=right | 1.0 km || 
|-id=766 bgcolor=#fefefe
| 227766 ||  || — || October 13, 2006 || Kitt Peak || Spacewatch || — || align=right data-sort-value="0.93" | 930 m || 
|-id=767 bgcolor=#fefefe
| 227767 Enkibilal ||  ||  || October 20, 2006 || Nogales || J.-C. Merlin || — || align=right data-sort-value="0.71" | 710 m || 
|-id=768 bgcolor=#fefefe
| 227768 ||  || — || October 17, 2006 || Catalina || CSS || FLO || align=right data-sort-value="0.75" | 750 m || 
|-id=769 bgcolor=#fefefe
| 227769 ||  || — || October 17, 2006 || Kitt Peak || Spacewatch || — || align=right data-sort-value="0.95" | 950 m || 
|-id=770 bgcolor=#fefefe
| 227770 Wischnewski ||  ||  || October 30, 2006 || Altschwendt || W. Ries || — || align=right data-sort-value="0.78" | 780 m || 
|-id=771 bgcolor=#fefefe
| 227771 ||  || — || November 11, 2006 || Mount Lemmon || Mount Lemmon Survey || FLO || align=right data-sort-value="0.83" | 830 m || 
|-id=772 bgcolor=#fefefe
| 227772 ||  || — || November 11, 2006 || Catalina || CSS || — || align=right data-sort-value="0.76" | 760 m || 
|-id=773 bgcolor=#fefefe
| 227773 ||  || — || November 14, 2006 || Mount Lemmon || Mount Lemmon Survey || — || align=right | 1.6 km || 
|-id=774 bgcolor=#fefefe
| 227774 ||  || — || November 13, 2006 || Kitt Peak || Spacewatch || — || align=right | 1.0 km || 
|-id=775 bgcolor=#fefefe
| 227775 ||  || — || November 13, 2006 || Kitt Peak || Spacewatch || — || align=right | 1.1 km || 
|-id=776 bgcolor=#fefefe
| 227776 ||  || — || November 14, 2006 || Kitt Peak || Spacewatch || — || align=right data-sort-value="0.78" | 780 m || 
|-id=777 bgcolor=#fefefe
| 227777 ||  || — || November 15, 2006 || Kitt Peak || Spacewatch || FLO || align=right data-sort-value="0.79" | 790 m || 
|-id=778 bgcolor=#fefefe
| 227778 ||  || — || November 15, 2006 || Socorro || LINEAR || — || align=right | 1.2 km || 
|-id=779 bgcolor=#fefefe
| 227779 ||  || — || November 15, 2006 || Kitt Peak || Spacewatch || — || align=right data-sort-value="0.97" | 970 m || 
|-id=780 bgcolor=#fefefe
| 227780 ||  || — || November 18, 2006 || Kitt Peak || Spacewatch || — || align=right data-sort-value="0.85" | 850 m || 
|-id=781 bgcolor=#fefefe
| 227781 ||  || — || November 21, 2006 || Mount Lemmon || Mount Lemmon Survey || — || align=right | 1.5 km || 
|-id=782 bgcolor=#fefefe
| 227782 ||  || — || November 23, 2006 || Mount Lemmon || Mount Lemmon Survey || — || align=right data-sort-value="0.94" | 940 m || 
|-id=783 bgcolor=#E9E9E9
| 227783 ||  || — || November 23, 2006 || Kitt Peak || Spacewatch || — || align=right | 2.0 km || 
|-id=784 bgcolor=#fefefe
| 227784 ||  || — || November 27, 2006 || Mount Lemmon || Mount Lemmon Survey || MAS || align=right data-sort-value="0.82" | 820 m || 
|-id=785 bgcolor=#fefefe
| 227785 ||  || — || November 16, 2006 || Mount Lemmon || Mount Lemmon Survey || V || align=right data-sort-value="0.68" | 680 m || 
|-id=786 bgcolor=#fefefe
| 227786 ||  || — || November 25, 2006 || Kitt Peak || Spacewatch || FLO || align=right data-sort-value="0.68" | 680 m || 
|-id=787 bgcolor=#fefefe
| 227787 ||  || — || December 13, 2006 || Kitt Peak || Spacewatch || V || align=right data-sort-value="0.87" | 870 m || 
|-id=788 bgcolor=#fefefe
| 227788 ||  || — || December 13, 2006 || Mount Lemmon || Mount Lemmon Survey || — || align=right data-sort-value="0.87" | 870 m || 
|-id=789 bgcolor=#fefefe
| 227789 ||  || — || December 14, 2006 || Kitt Peak || Spacewatch || — || align=right | 1.3 km || 
|-id=790 bgcolor=#fefefe
| 227790 ||  || — || December 14, 2006 || Kitt Peak || Spacewatch || MAS || align=right data-sort-value="0.91" | 910 m || 
|-id=791 bgcolor=#fefefe
| 227791 ||  || — || December 14, 2006 || Kitt Peak || Spacewatch || — || align=right data-sort-value="0.85" | 850 m || 
|-id=792 bgcolor=#fefefe
| 227792 ||  || — || December 11, 2006 || Kitt Peak || Spacewatch || V || align=right data-sort-value="0.96" | 960 m || 
|-id=793 bgcolor=#E9E9E9
| 227793 ||  || — || December 20, 2006 || Mount Lemmon || Mount Lemmon Survey || — || align=right | 1.9 km || 
|-id=794 bgcolor=#fefefe
| 227794 ||  || — || December 21, 2006 || Kitt Peak || Spacewatch || V || align=right data-sort-value="0.98" | 980 m || 
|-id=795 bgcolor=#fefefe
| 227795 ||  || — || December 24, 2006 || Mount Lemmon || Mount Lemmon Survey || NYS || align=right data-sort-value="0.88" | 880 m || 
|-id=796 bgcolor=#fefefe
| 227796 ||  || — || December 21, 2006 || Kitt Peak || Spacewatch || — || align=right | 1.2 km || 
|-id=797 bgcolor=#fefefe
| 227797 ||  || — || December 21, 2006 || Kitt Peak || Spacewatch || FLO || align=right | 1.9 km || 
|-id=798 bgcolor=#fefefe
| 227798 ||  || — || December 21, 2006 || Kitt Peak || Spacewatch || — || align=right | 1.7 km || 
|-id=799 bgcolor=#fefefe
| 227799 ||  || — || December 21, 2006 || Kitt Peak || Spacewatch || — || align=right | 1.0 km || 
|-id=800 bgcolor=#fefefe
| 227800 ||  || — || December 21, 2006 || Kitt Peak || M. W. Buie || — || align=right | 1.1 km || 
|}

227801–227900 

|-bgcolor=#fefefe
| 227801 ||  || — || January 9, 2007 || Mount Lemmon || Mount Lemmon Survey || FLO || align=right data-sort-value="0.84" | 840 m || 
|-id=802 bgcolor=#fefefe
| 227802 ||  || — || January 10, 2007 || Catalina || CSS || — || align=right | 1.0 km || 
|-id=803 bgcolor=#fefefe
| 227803 ||  || — || January 10, 2007 || Mount Lemmon || Mount Lemmon Survey || V || align=right | 1.0 km || 
|-id=804 bgcolor=#fefefe
| 227804 || 2007 BQ || — || January 16, 2007 || Socorro || LINEAR || FLO || align=right data-sort-value="0.98" | 980 m || 
|-id=805 bgcolor=#fefefe
| 227805 ||  || — || January 16, 2007 || Catalina || CSS || NYS || align=right data-sort-value="0.93" | 930 m || 
|-id=806 bgcolor=#fefefe
| 227806 ||  || — || January 17, 2007 || Palomar || NEAT || V || align=right data-sort-value="0.89" | 890 m || 
|-id=807 bgcolor=#fefefe
| 227807 ||  || — || January 17, 2007 || Palomar || NEAT || NYS || align=right data-sort-value="0.85" | 850 m || 
|-id=808 bgcolor=#fefefe
| 227808 ||  || — || January 24, 2007 || Socorro || LINEAR || — || align=right data-sort-value="0.71" | 710 m || 
|-id=809 bgcolor=#fefefe
| 227809 ||  || — || January 24, 2007 || Mount Lemmon || Mount Lemmon Survey || NYS || align=right | 1.7 km || 
|-id=810 bgcolor=#E9E9E9
| 227810 ||  || — || January 24, 2007 || Mount Lemmon || Mount Lemmon Survey || RAF || align=right | 1.6 km || 
|-id=811 bgcolor=#fefefe
| 227811 ||  || — || January 24, 2007 || Catalina || CSS || — || align=right data-sort-value="0.70" | 700 m || 
|-id=812 bgcolor=#fefefe
| 227812 ||  || — || January 26, 2007 || Kitt Peak || Spacewatch || NYS || align=right | 1.9 km || 
|-id=813 bgcolor=#fefefe
| 227813 ||  || — || January 27, 2007 || Mount Lemmon || Mount Lemmon Survey || — || align=right data-sort-value="0.88" | 880 m || 
|-id=814 bgcolor=#fefefe
| 227814 ||  || — || January 28, 2007 || Marly || P. Kocher || — || align=right | 1.0 km || 
|-id=815 bgcolor=#fefefe
| 227815 ||  || — || January 27, 2007 || Mount Lemmon || Mount Lemmon Survey || — || align=right | 1.9 km || 
|-id=816 bgcolor=#fefefe
| 227816 ||  || — || January 27, 2007 || Mount Lemmon || Mount Lemmon Survey || V || align=right data-sort-value="0.82" | 820 m || 
|-id=817 bgcolor=#fefefe
| 227817 ||  || — || January 27, 2007 || Mount Lemmon || Mount Lemmon Survey || NYS || align=right data-sort-value="0.98" | 980 m || 
|-id=818 bgcolor=#fefefe
| 227818 ||  || — || January 28, 2007 || Mount Lemmon || Mount Lemmon Survey || NYS || align=right data-sort-value="0.81" | 810 m || 
|-id=819 bgcolor=#fefefe
| 227819 ||  || — || January 29, 2007 || Kitt Peak || Spacewatch || — || align=right | 1.7 km || 
|-id=820 bgcolor=#E9E9E9
| 227820 ||  || — || January 28, 2007 || Mount Lemmon || Mount Lemmon Survey || — || align=right | 1.9 km || 
|-id=821 bgcolor=#fefefe
| 227821 ||  || — || February 6, 2007 || Mount Lemmon || Mount Lemmon Survey || — || align=right data-sort-value="0.87" | 870 m || 
|-id=822 bgcolor=#fefefe
| 227822 ||  || — || February 6, 2007 || Kitt Peak || Spacewatch || V || align=right data-sort-value="0.68" | 680 m || 
|-id=823 bgcolor=#fefefe
| 227823 ||  || — || February 5, 2007 || Palomar || NEAT || FLO || align=right | 1.1 km || 
|-id=824 bgcolor=#fefefe
| 227824 ||  || — || February 6, 2007 || Mount Lemmon || Mount Lemmon Survey || — || align=right | 1.1 km || 
|-id=825 bgcolor=#fefefe
| 227825 ||  || — || February 6, 2007 || Lulin Observatory || H.-C. Lin, Q.-z. Ye || NYS || align=right | 1.1 km || 
|-id=826 bgcolor=#fefefe
| 227826 ||  || — || February 8, 2007 || Kitt Peak || Spacewatch || — || align=right | 1.3 km || 
|-id=827 bgcolor=#fefefe
| 227827 ||  || — || February 8, 2007 || Kitt Peak || Spacewatch || — || align=right | 1.7 km || 
|-id=828 bgcolor=#fefefe
| 227828 ||  || — || February 6, 2007 || Kitt Peak || Spacewatch || — || align=right | 2.2 km || 
|-id=829 bgcolor=#fefefe
| 227829 ||  || — || February 6, 2007 || Mount Lemmon || Mount Lemmon Survey || V || align=right data-sort-value="0.78" | 780 m || 
|-id=830 bgcolor=#fefefe
| 227830 ||  || — || February 6, 2007 || Kitt Peak || Spacewatch || NYS || align=right data-sort-value="0.81" | 810 m || 
|-id=831 bgcolor=#fefefe
| 227831 ||  || — || February 7, 2007 || Kitt Peak || Spacewatch || NYS || align=right data-sort-value="0.84" | 840 m || 
|-id=832 bgcolor=#fefefe
| 227832 ||  || — || February 7, 2007 || Kitt Peak || Spacewatch || — || align=right | 1.1 km || 
|-id=833 bgcolor=#fefefe
| 227833 ||  || — || February 8, 2007 || Palomar || NEAT || V || align=right | 1.1 km || 
|-id=834 bgcolor=#fefefe
| 227834 ||  || — || February 9, 2007 || Kitt Peak || Spacewatch || NYS || align=right data-sort-value="0.87" | 870 m || 
|-id=835 bgcolor=#fefefe
| 227835 ||  || — || February 14, 2007 || Črni Vrh || Črni Vrh || — || align=right | 1.8 km || 
|-id=836 bgcolor=#fefefe
| 227836 ||  || — || February 15, 2007 || Catalina || CSS || FLO || align=right data-sort-value="0.71" | 710 m || 
|-id=837 bgcolor=#fefefe
| 227837 ||  || — || February 15, 2007 || Catalina || CSS || NYS || align=right | 1.1 km || 
|-id=838 bgcolor=#fefefe
| 227838 ||  || — || February 15, 2007 || Catalina || CSS || — || align=right | 1.2 km || 
|-id=839 bgcolor=#fefefe
| 227839 ||  || — || February 14, 2007 || Mauna Kea || Mauna Kea Obs. || NYS || align=right data-sort-value="0.63" | 630 m || 
|-id=840 bgcolor=#fefefe
| 227840 ||  || — || February 16, 2007 || Calvin-Rehoboth || Calvin–Rehoboth Obs. || MAS || align=right data-sort-value="0.91" | 910 m || 
|-id=841 bgcolor=#fefefe
| 227841 ||  || — || February 17, 2007 || Kitt Peak || Spacewatch || ERI || align=right | 1.7 km || 
|-id=842 bgcolor=#fefefe
| 227842 ||  || — || February 17, 2007 || Calvin-Rehoboth || Calvin–Rehoboth Obs. || MAS || align=right data-sort-value="0.79" | 790 m || 
|-id=843 bgcolor=#E9E9E9
| 227843 ||  || — || February 17, 2007 || Kitt Peak || Spacewatch || — || align=right | 1.6 km || 
|-id=844 bgcolor=#E9E9E9
| 227844 ||  || — || February 17, 2007 || Kitt Peak || Spacewatch || — || align=right | 1.4 km || 
|-id=845 bgcolor=#fefefe
| 227845 ||  || — || February 17, 2007 || Kitt Peak || Spacewatch || NYS || align=right | 2.3 km || 
|-id=846 bgcolor=#E9E9E9
| 227846 ||  || — || February 17, 2007 || Kitt Peak || Spacewatch || — || align=right | 2.1 km || 
|-id=847 bgcolor=#fefefe
| 227847 ||  || — || February 17, 2007 || Kitt Peak || Spacewatch || MAS || align=right data-sort-value="0.98" | 980 m || 
|-id=848 bgcolor=#fefefe
| 227848 ||  || — || February 17, 2007 || Kitt Peak || Spacewatch || NYS || align=right | 2.6 km || 
|-id=849 bgcolor=#fefefe
| 227849 ||  || — || February 17, 2007 || Kitt Peak || Spacewatch || NYS || align=right data-sort-value="0.73" | 730 m || 
|-id=850 bgcolor=#fefefe
| 227850 ||  || — || February 17, 2007 || Kitt Peak || Spacewatch || MAS || align=right | 1.0 km || 
|-id=851 bgcolor=#E9E9E9
| 227851 ||  || — || February 17, 2007 || Kitt Peak || Spacewatch || — || align=right | 1.5 km || 
|-id=852 bgcolor=#fefefe
| 227852 ||  || — || February 21, 2007 || Socorro || LINEAR || MAS || align=right | 1.00 km || 
|-id=853 bgcolor=#fefefe
| 227853 ||  || — || February 21, 2007 || Mount Lemmon || Mount Lemmon Survey || MAS || align=right data-sort-value="0.91" | 910 m || 
|-id=854 bgcolor=#E9E9E9
| 227854 ||  || — || February 16, 2007 || Catalina || CSS || — || align=right | 1.4 km || 
|-id=855 bgcolor=#fefefe
| 227855 ||  || — || February 19, 2007 || Mount Lemmon || Mount Lemmon Survey || — || align=right data-sort-value="0.93" | 930 m || 
|-id=856 bgcolor=#E9E9E9
| 227856 ||  || — || February 21, 2007 || Kitt Peak || Spacewatch || — || align=right | 1.1 km || 
|-id=857 bgcolor=#E9E9E9
| 227857 ||  || — || February 21, 2007 || Kitt Peak || Spacewatch || — || align=right | 2.7 km || 
|-id=858 bgcolor=#fefefe
| 227858 ||  || — || February 21, 2007 || Kitt Peak || Spacewatch || — || align=right data-sort-value="0.83" | 830 m || 
|-id=859 bgcolor=#fefefe
| 227859 ||  || — || February 22, 2007 || Anderson Mesa || LONEOS || — || align=right | 1.4 km || 
|-id=860 bgcolor=#fefefe
| 227860 ||  || — || February 23, 2007 || Kitt Peak || Spacewatch || NYS || align=right data-sort-value="0.68" | 680 m || 
|-id=861 bgcolor=#E9E9E9
| 227861 ||  || — || February 23, 2007 || Catalina || CSS || — || align=right | 2.0 km || 
|-id=862 bgcolor=#E9E9E9
| 227862 ||  || — || February 23, 2007 || Kitt Peak || Spacewatch || — || align=right | 2.9 km || 
|-id=863 bgcolor=#fefefe
| 227863 ||  || — || February 23, 2007 || Kitt Peak || Spacewatch || NYS || align=right | 1.9 km || 
|-id=864 bgcolor=#E9E9E9
| 227864 ||  || — || February 23, 2007 || Kitt Peak || Spacewatch || — || align=right | 2.8 km || 
|-id=865 bgcolor=#E9E9E9
| 227865 ||  || — || February 23, 2007 || Kitt Peak || Spacewatch || — || align=right | 2.7 km || 
|-id=866 bgcolor=#fefefe
| 227866 ||  || — || February 23, 2007 || Kitt Peak || Spacewatch || MAS || align=right | 1.0 km || 
|-id=867 bgcolor=#fefefe
| 227867 ||  || — || February 23, 2007 || Kitt Peak || Spacewatch || NYS || align=right data-sort-value="0.65" | 650 m || 
|-id=868 bgcolor=#E9E9E9
| 227868 ||  || — || February 26, 2007 || Mount Lemmon || Mount Lemmon Survey || — || align=right | 1.2 km || 
|-id=869 bgcolor=#E9E9E9
| 227869 ||  || — || February 17, 2007 || Kitt Peak || Spacewatch || HEN || align=right | 1.2 km || 
|-id=870 bgcolor=#fefefe
| 227870 ||  || — || February 26, 2007 || Mount Lemmon || Mount Lemmon Survey || — || align=right | 1.1 km || 
|-id=871 bgcolor=#E9E9E9
| 227871 ||  || — || March 9, 2007 || Mount Lemmon || Mount Lemmon Survey || — || align=right | 1.2 km || 
|-id=872 bgcolor=#E9E9E9
| 227872 ||  || — || March 9, 2007 || Mount Lemmon || Mount Lemmon Survey || — || align=right | 3.0 km || 
|-id=873 bgcolor=#E9E9E9
| 227873 ||  || — || March 9, 2007 || Kitt Peak || Spacewatch || — || align=right | 2.4 km || 
|-id=874 bgcolor=#fefefe
| 227874 ||  || — || March 9, 2007 || Kitt Peak || Spacewatch || — || align=right | 1.5 km || 
|-id=875 bgcolor=#fefefe
| 227875 ||  || — || March 9, 2007 || Mount Lemmon || Mount Lemmon Survey || MAS || align=right | 1.1 km || 
|-id=876 bgcolor=#fefefe
| 227876 ||  || — || March 9, 2007 || Palomar || NEAT || ERI || align=right | 2.8 km || 
|-id=877 bgcolor=#E9E9E9
| 227877 ||  || — || March 10, 2007 || Kitt Peak || Spacewatch || — || align=right | 2.3 km || 
|-id=878 bgcolor=#fefefe
| 227878 ||  || — || March 10, 2007 || Mount Lemmon || Mount Lemmon Survey || NYS || align=right data-sort-value="0.96" | 960 m || 
|-id=879 bgcolor=#E9E9E9
| 227879 ||  || — || March 10, 2007 || Mount Lemmon || Mount Lemmon Survey || — || align=right | 2.3 km || 
|-id=880 bgcolor=#E9E9E9
| 227880 ||  || — || March 10, 2007 || Palomar || NEAT || — || align=right | 1.7 km || 
|-id=881 bgcolor=#fefefe
| 227881 ||  || — || March 9, 2007 || Catalina || CSS || NYS || align=right data-sort-value="0.80" | 800 m || 
|-id=882 bgcolor=#fefefe
| 227882 ||  || — || March 10, 2007 || Kitt Peak || Spacewatch || — || align=right | 1.1 km || 
|-id=883 bgcolor=#E9E9E9
| 227883 ||  || — || March 11, 2007 || Mount Lemmon || Mount Lemmon Survey || — || align=right | 1.3 km || 
|-id=884 bgcolor=#E9E9E9
| 227884 ||  || — || March 9, 2007 || Kitt Peak || Spacewatch || HOF || align=right | 3.3 km || 
|-id=885 bgcolor=#d6d6d6
| 227885 ||  || — || March 9, 2007 || Kitt Peak || Spacewatch || — || align=right | 3.1 km || 
|-id=886 bgcolor=#E9E9E9
| 227886 ||  || — || March 9, 2007 || Kitt Peak || Spacewatch || — || align=right | 1.7 km || 
|-id=887 bgcolor=#E9E9E9
| 227887 ||  || — || March 9, 2007 || Kitt Peak || Spacewatch || — || align=right | 2.1 km || 
|-id=888 bgcolor=#E9E9E9
| 227888 ||  || — || March 9, 2007 || Kitt Peak || Spacewatch || HOF || align=right | 3.7 km || 
|-id=889 bgcolor=#fefefe
| 227889 ||  || — || March 9, 2007 || Kitt Peak || Spacewatch || — || align=right data-sort-value="0.90" | 900 m || 
|-id=890 bgcolor=#fefefe
| 227890 ||  || — || March 9, 2007 || Kitt Peak || Spacewatch || NYS || align=right data-sort-value="0.66" | 660 m || 
|-id=891 bgcolor=#fefefe
| 227891 ||  || — || March 10, 2007 || Kitt Peak || Spacewatch || NYS || align=right data-sort-value="0.93" | 930 m || 
|-id=892 bgcolor=#d6d6d6
| 227892 ||  || — || March 10, 2007 || Kitt Peak || Spacewatch || — || align=right | 3.9 km || 
|-id=893 bgcolor=#E9E9E9
| 227893 ||  || — || March 10, 2007 || Kitt Peak || Spacewatch || — || align=right | 2.0 km || 
|-id=894 bgcolor=#fefefe
| 227894 ||  || — || March 10, 2007 || Kitt Peak || Spacewatch || — || align=right | 1.2 km || 
|-id=895 bgcolor=#d6d6d6
| 227895 ||  || — || March 11, 2007 || Kitt Peak || Spacewatch || — || align=right | 3.8 km || 
|-id=896 bgcolor=#E9E9E9
| 227896 ||  || — || March 13, 2007 || Mount Lemmon || Mount Lemmon Survey || XIZ || align=right | 1.8 km || 
|-id=897 bgcolor=#fefefe
| 227897 ||  || — || March 9, 2007 || Palomar || NEAT || — || align=right data-sort-value="0.84" | 840 m || 
|-id=898 bgcolor=#fefefe
| 227898 ||  || — || March 9, 2007 || Mount Lemmon || Mount Lemmon Survey || NYS || align=right data-sort-value="0.93" | 930 m || 
|-id=899 bgcolor=#E9E9E9
| 227899 ||  || — || March 9, 2007 || Mount Lemmon || Mount Lemmon Survey || — || align=right | 1.9 km || 
|-id=900 bgcolor=#fefefe
| 227900 ||  || — || March 9, 2007 || Mount Lemmon || Mount Lemmon Survey || MAS || align=right data-sort-value="0.72" | 720 m || 
|}

227901–228000 

|-bgcolor=#E9E9E9
| 227901 ||  || — || March 12, 2007 || Kitt Peak || Spacewatch || — || align=right | 2.9 km || 
|-id=902 bgcolor=#d6d6d6
| 227902 ||  || — || March 12, 2007 || Kitt Peak || Spacewatch || — || align=right | 4.2 km || 
|-id=903 bgcolor=#E9E9E9
| 227903 ||  || — || March 15, 2007 || Mount Lemmon || Mount Lemmon Survey || 526 || align=right | 3.7 km || 
|-id=904 bgcolor=#E9E9E9
| 227904 ||  || — || March 13, 2007 || Kitt Peak || Spacewatch || — || align=right | 2.4 km || 
|-id=905 bgcolor=#E9E9E9
| 227905 ||  || — || March 11, 2007 || Mount Lemmon || Mount Lemmon Survey || AER || align=right | 2.0 km || 
|-id=906 bgcolor=#d6d6d6
| 227906 ||  || — || March 14, 2007 || Kitt Peak || Spacewatch || — || align=right | 3.9 km || 
|-id=907 bgcolor=#d6d6d6
| 227907 ||  || — || March 14, 2007 || Mount Lemmon || Mount Lemmon Survey || — || align=right | 4.3 km || 
|-id=908 bgcolor=#E9E9E9
| 227908 ||  || — || March 14, 2007 || Kitt Peak || Spacewatch || — || align=right | 1.4 km || 
|-id=909 bgcolor=#E9E9E9
| 227909 ||  || — || March 9, 2007 || Catalina || CSS || — || align=right | 1.2 km || 
|-id=910 bgcolor=#fefefe
| 227910 ||  || — || March 15, 2007 || Kitt Peak || Spacewatch || NYS || align=right data-sort-value="0.72" | 720 m || 
|-id=911 bgcolor=#E9E9E9
| 227911 ||  || — || March 15, 2007 || Kitt Peak || Spacewatch || — || align=right | 1.4 km || 
|-id=912 bgcolor=#E9E9E9
| 227912 ||  || — || March 15, 2007 || Kitt Peak || Spacewatch || — || align=right | 1.8 km || 
|-id=913 bgcolor=#E9E9E9
| 227913 ||  || — || March 10, 2007 || Kitt Peak || Spacewatch || HEN || align=right | 1.5 km || 
|-id=914 bgcolor=#E9E9E9
| 227914 ||  || — || March 14, 2007 || Mount Lemmon || Mount Lemmon Survey || — || align=right | 1.8 km || 
|-id=915 bgcolor=#E9E9E9
| 227915 || 2007 FQ || — || March 16, 2007 || Mount Lemmon || Mount Lemmon Survey || — || align=right | 2.4 km || 
|-id=916 bgcolor=#fefefe
| 227916 ||  || — || March 17, 2007 || Anderson Mesa || LONEOS || NYS || align=right data-sort-value="0.90" | 900 m || 
|-id=917 bgcolor=#fefefe
| 227917 ||  || — || March 20, 2007 || Kitt Peak || Spacewatch || — || align=right data-sort-value="0.96" | 960 m || 
|-id=918 bgcolor=#fefefe
| 227918 ||  || — || March 20, 2007 || Kitt Peak || Spacewatch || NYS || align=right | 1.0 km || 
|-id=919 bgcolor=#E9E9E9
| 227919 ||  || — || March 26, 2007 || Kitt Peak || Spacewatch || — || align=right data-sort-value="0.96" | 960 m || 
|-id=920 bgcolor=#E9E9E9
| 227920 ||  || — || March 26, 2007 || Kitt Peak || Spacewatch || — || align=right | 1.9 km || 
|-id=921 bgcolor=#E9E9E9
| 227921 ||  || — || March 26, 2007 || Mount Lemmon || Mount Lemmon Survey || — || align=right | 3.8 km || 
|-id=922 bgcolor=#E9E9E9
| 227922 ||  || — || March 26, 2007 || Mount Lemmon || Mount Lemmon Survey || — || align=right | 2.3 km || 
|-id=923 bgcolor=#E9E9E9
| 227923 ||  || — || March 26, 2007 || Kitt Peak || Spacewatch || — || align=right | 2.2 km || 
|-id=924 bgcolor=#E9E9E9
| 227924 ||  || — || March 26, 2007 || Catalina || CSS || MAR || align=right | 1.8 km || 
|-id=925 bgcolor=#E9E9E9
| 227925 ||  || — || March 25, 2007 || Catalina || CSS || — || align=right | 4.5 km || 
|-id=926 bgcolor=#d6d6d6
| 227926 ||  || — || March 26, 2007 || Kitt Peak || Spacewatch || — || align=right | 2.7 km || 
|-id=927 bgcolor=#E9E9E9
| 227927 || 2007 GB || — || April 3, 2007 || Palomar || NEAT || — || align=right | 4.2 km || 
|-id=928 bgcolor=#d6d6d6
| 227928 ||  || — || April 6, 2007 || Vicques || M. Ory || — || align=right | 5.0 km || 
|-id=929 bgcolor=#E9E9E9
| 227929 ||  || — || April 11, 2007 || Vicques || M. Ory || HNA || align=right | 3.1 km || 
|-id=930 bgcolor=#d6d6d6
| 227930 Athos ||  ||  || April 14, 2007 || Saint-Sulpice || B. Christophe || — || align=right | 4.2 km || 
|-id=931 bgcolor=#E9E9E9
| 227931 ||  || — || April 7, 2007 || Mount Lemmon || Mount Lemmon Survey || HEN || align=right | 1.3 km || 
|-id=932 bgcolor=#d6d6d6
| 227932 ||  || — || April 7, 2007 || Mount Lemmon || Mount Lemmon Survey || KAR || align=right | 1.2 km || 
|-id=933 bgcolor=#fefefe
| 227933 ||  || — || April 11, 2007 || Mount Lemmon || Mount Lemmon Survey || MAS || align=right data-sort-value="0.78" | 780 m || 
|-id=934 bgcolor=#E9E9E9
| 227934 ||  || — || April 11, 2007 || Kitt Peak || Spacewatch || HOF || align=right | 3.8 km || 
|-id=935 bgcolor=#d6d6d6
| 227935 ||  || — || April 11, 2007 || Mount Lemmon || Mount Lemmon Survey || KOR || align=right | 1.8 km || 
|-id=936 bgcolor=#d6d6d6
| 227936 ||  || — || April 11, 2007 || Mount Lemmon || Mount Lemmon Survey || — || align=right | 3.8 km || 
|-id=937 bgcolor=#E9E9E9
| 227937 ||  || — || April 11, 2007 || Mount Lemmon || Mount Lemmon Survey || — || align=right | 2.6 km || 
|-id=938 bgcolor=#E9E9E9
| 227938 ||  || — || April 14, 2007 || Mount Lemmon || Mount Lemmon Survey || — || align=right | 3.1 km || 
|-id=939 bgcolor=#d6d6d6
| 227939 ||  || — || April 11, 2007 || Kitt Peak || Spacewatch || — || align=right | 3.6 km || 
|-id=940 bgcolor=#d6d6d6
| 227940 ||  || — || April 13, 2007 || Siding Spring || SSS || — || align=right | 5.6 km || 
|-id=941 bgcolor=#d6d6d6
| 227941 ||  || — || April 14, 2007 || Kitt Peak || Spacewatch || — || align=right | 4.2 km || 
|-id=942 bgcolor=#E9E9E9
| 227942 ||  || — || April 14, 2007 || Kitt Peak || Spacewatch || HEN || align=right | 1.3 km || 
|-id=943 bgcolor=#E9E9E9
| 227943 ||  || — || April 14, 2007 || Kitt Peak || Spacewatch || — || align=right | 2.4 km || 
|-id=944 bgcolor=#E9E9E9
| 227944 ||  || — || April 14, 2007 || Kitt Peak || Spacewatch || — || align=right | 1.1 km || 
|-id=945 bgcolor=#E9E9E9
| 227945 ||  || — || April 14, 2007 || Kitt Peak || Spacewatch || — || align=right | 3.0 km || 
|-id=946 bgcolor=#E9E9E9
| 227946 ||  || — || April 14, 2007 || Kitt Peak || Spacewatch || — || align=right | 1.2 km || 
|-id=947 bgcolor=#E9E9E9
| 227947 ||  || — || April 14, 2007 || Kitt Peak || Spacewatch || AGN || align=right | 1.5 km || 
|-id=948 bgcolor=#E9E9E9
| 227948 ||  || — || April 14, 2007 || Kitt Peak || Spacewatch || EUN || align=right | 1.4 km || 
|-id=949 bgcolor=#E9E9E9
| 227949 ||  || — || April 15, 2007 || Socorro || LINEAR || — || align=right | 3.9 km || 
|-id=950 bgcolor=#fefefe
| 227950 ||  || — || April 15, 2007 || Kitt Peak || Spacewatch || — || align=right data-sort-value="0.98" | 980 m || 
|-id=951 bgcolor=#E9E9E9
| 227951 ||  || — || April 15, 2007 || Kitt Peak || Spacewatch || EUN || align=right | 1.6 km || 
|-id=952 bgcolor=#E9E9E9
| 227952 ||  || — || April 15, 2007 || Kitt Peak || Spacewatch || — || align=right | 3.7 km || 
|-id=953 bgcolor=#d6d6d6
| 227953 ||  || — || April 15, 2007 || Kitt Peak || Spacewatch || FIR || align=right | 4.1 km || 
|-id=954 bgcolor=#d6d6d6
| 227954 ||  || — || April 15, 2007 || Catalina || CSS || — || align=right | 8.8 km || 
|-id=955 bgcolor=#d6d6d6
| 227955 ||  || — || April 15, 2007 || Kitt Peak || Spacewatch || EOS || align=right | 3.3 km || 
|-id=956 bgcolor=#E9E9E9
| 227956 ||  || — || April 15, 2007 || Mount Lemmon || Mount Lemmon Survey || AST || align=right | 2.3 km || 
|-id=957 bgcolor=#E9E9E9
| 227957 ||  || — || April 15, 2007 || Mount Lemmon || Mount Lemmon Survey || AST || align=right | 3.3 km || 
|-id=958 bgcolor=#E9E9E9
| 227958 || 2007 HH || — || April 16, 2007 || 7300 Observatory || W. K. Y. Yeung || NEM || align=right | 3.7 km || 
|-id=959 bgcolor=#d6d6d6
| 227959 ||  || — || April 16, 2007 || Catalina || CSS || — || align=right | 4.1 km || 
|-id=960 bgcolor=#d6d6d6
| 227960 ||  || — || April 16, 2007 || Socorro || LINEAR || — || align=right | 5.5 km || 
|-id=961 bgcolor=#E9E9E9
| 227961 ||  || — || April 18, 2007 || Mount Lemmon || Mount Lemmon Survey || EUN || align=right | 1.2 km || 
|-id=962 bgcolor=#d6d6d6
| 227962 Aramis ||  ||  || April 19, 2007 || Saint-Sulpice || B. Christophe || — || align=right | 4.5 km || 
|-id=963 bgcolor=#E9E9E9
| 227963 ||  || — || April 16, 2007 || Socorro || LINEAR || — || align=right | 3.5 km || 
|-id=964 bgcolor=#E9E9E9
| 227964 ||  || — || April 18, 2007 || Kitt Peak || Spacewatch || — || align=right | 3.1 km || 
|-id=965 bgcolor=#d6d6d6
| 227965 ||  || — || April 18, 2007 || Kitt Peak || Spacewatch || EOS || align=right | 3.1 km || 
|-id=966 bgcolor=#E9E9E9
| 227966 ||  || — || April 18, 2007 || Kitt Peak || Spacewatch || HOF || align=right | 3.5 km || 
|-id=967 bgcolor=#d6d6d6
| 227967 ||  || — || April 18, 2007 || Kitt Peak || Spacewatch || HYG || align=right | 3.7 km || 
|-id=968 bgcolor=#d6d6d6
| 227968 ||  || — || April 18, 2007 || Kitt Peak || Spacewatch || HYG || align=right | 4.1 km || 
|-id=969 bgcolor=#E9E9E9
| 227969 ||  || — || April 19, 2007 || Mount Lemmon || Mount Lemmon Survey || — || align=right | 2.0 km || 
|-id=970 bgcolor=#d6d6d6
| 227970 ||  || — || April 19, 2007 || Mount Lemmon || Mount Lemmon Survey || — || align=right | 2.9 km || 
|-id=971 bgcolor=#d6d6d6
| 227971 ||  || — || April 19, 2007 || Kitt Peak || Spacewatch || EOS || align=right | 4.0 km || 
|-id=972 bgcolor=#d6d6d6
| 227972 ||  || — || April 20, 2007 || Kitt Peak || Spacewatch || EOS || align=right | 2.9 km || 
|-id=973 bgcolor=#d6d6d6
| 227973 ||  || — || April 20, 2007 || Kitt Peak || Spacewatch || — || align=right | 3.8 km || 
|-id=974 bgcolor=#d6d6d6
| 227974 ||  || — || April 20, 2007 || Kitt Peak || Spacewatch || — || align=right | 2.6 km || 
|-id=975 bgcolor=#d6d6d6
| 227975 ||  || — || April 22, 2007 || Mount Lemmon || Mount Lemmon Survey || — || align=right | 2.6 km || 
|-id=976 bgcolor=#d6d6d6
| 227976 ||  || — || April 22, 2007 || Mount Lemmon || Mount Lemmon Survey || HYG || align=right | 3.6 km || 
|-id=977 bgcolor=#d6d6d6
| 227977 ||  || — || April 24, 2007 || Kitt Peak || Spacewatch || EOS || align=right | 2.6 km || 
|-id=978 bgcolor=#d6d6d6
| 227978 ||  || — || April 25, 2007 || Mount Lemmon || Mount Lemmon Survey || — || align=right | 3.7 km || 
|-id=979 bgcolor=#d6d6d6
| 227979 ||  || — || April 24, 2007 || Kitt Peak || Spacewatch || — || align=right | 3.9 km || 
|-id=980 bgcolor=#d6d6d6
| 227980 ||  || — || April 27, 2007 || Desert Moon || B. L. Stevens || — || align=right | 4.2 km || 
|-id=981 bgcolor=#fefefe
| 227981 ||  || — || April 20, 2007 || Kitt Peak || Spacewatch || — || align=right | 1.0 km || 
|-id=982 bgcolor=#d6d6d6
| 227982 ||  || — || May 7, 2007 || Kitt Peak || Spacewatch || HYG || align=right | 3.1 km || 
|-id=983 bgcolor=#d6d6d6
| 227983 ||  || — || May 7, 2007 || Catalina || CSS || — || align=right | 5.3 km || 
|-id=984 bgcolor=#d6d6d6
| 227984 ||  || — || May 7, 2007 || Catalina || CSS || — || align=right | 5.1 km || 
|-id=985 bgcolor=#d6d6d6
| 227985 ||  || — || May 8, 2007 || Anderson Mesa || LONEOS || — || align=right | 3.9 km || 
|-id=986 bgcolor=#d6d6d6
| 227986 ||  || — || May 7, 2007 || Lulin Observatory || LUSS || EOS || align=right | 3.2 km || 
|-id=987 bgcolor=#d6d6d6
| 227987 ||  || — || May 6, 2007 || Kitt Peak || Spacewatch || — || align=right | 3.5 km || 
|-id=988 bgcolor=#d6d6d6
| 227988 ||  || — || May 9, 2007 || Mount Lemmon || Mount Lemmon Survey || — || align=right | 3.1 km || 
|-id=989 bgcolor=#E9E9E9
| 227989 ||  || — || May 9, 2007 || Mount Lemmon || Mount Lemmon Survey || AST || align=right | 2.2 km || 
|-id=990 bgcolor=#d6d6d6
| 227990 ||  || — || May 7, 2007 || Lulin Observatory || Lulin Obs. || — || align=right | 5.2 km || 
|-id=991 bgcolor=#E9E9E9
| 227991 ||  || — || May 7, 2007 || Kitt Peak || Spacewatch || EUN || align=right | 2.5 km || 
|-id=992 bgcolor=#d6d6d6
| 227992 ||  || — || May 7, 2007 || Kitt Peak || Spacewatch || HYG || align=right | 3.3 km || 
|-id=993 bgcolor=#d6d6d6
| 227993 ||  || — || May 7, 2007 || Kitt Peak || Spacewatch || — || align=right | 2.6 km || 
|-id=994 bgcolor=#d6d6d6
| 227994 ||  || — || May 9, 2007 || Kitt Peak || Spacewatch || EOS || align=right | 2.6 km || 
|-id=995 bgcolor=#d6d6d6
| 227995 ||  || — || May 9, 2007 || Mount Lemmon || Mount Lemmon Survey || — || align=right | 3.5 km || 
|-id=996 bgcolor=#E9E9E9
| 227996 ||  || — || May 12, 2007 || Mount Lemmon || Mount Lemmon Survey || NEM || align=right | 2.2 km || 
|-id=997 bgcolor=#d6d6d6
| 227997 NIGLAS ||  ||  || May 16, 2007 || XuYi || PMO NEO || — || align=right | 5.9 km || 
|-id=998 bgcolor=#d6d6d6
| 227998 ||  || — || June 7, 2007 || Kitt Peak || Spacewatch || EOS || align=right | 2.3 km || 
|-id=999 bgcolor=#d6d6d6
| 227999 ||  || — || June 14, 2007 || Kitt Peak || Spacewatch || THM || align=right | 3.2 km || 
|-id=000 bgcolor=#d6d6d6
| 228000 ||  || — || June 16, 2007 || Kitt Peak || Spacewatch || — || align=right | 5.9 km || 
|}

References

External links 
 Discovery Circumstances: Numbered Minor Planets (225001)–(230000) (IAU Minor Planet Center)

0227